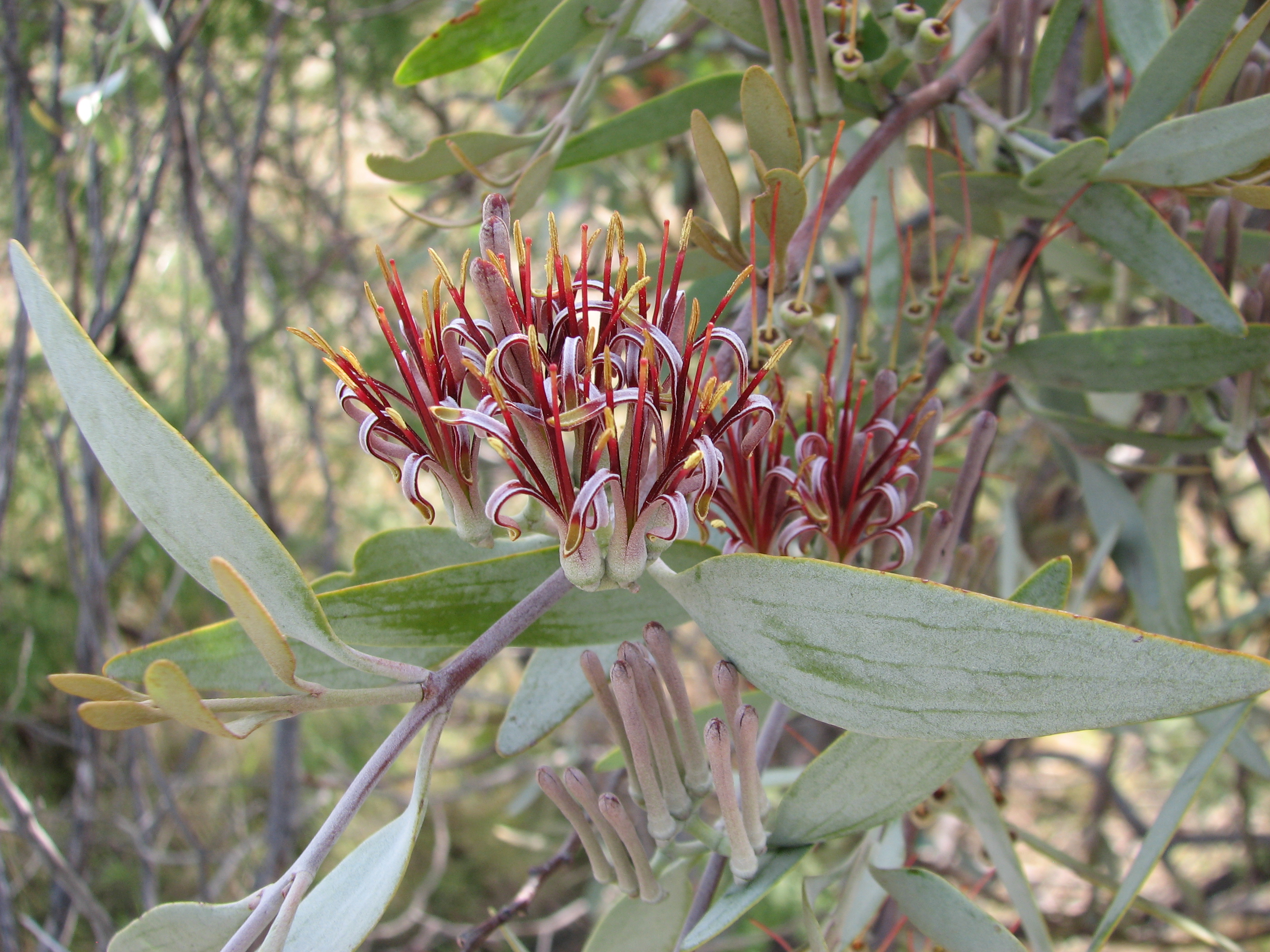

Scientific classification
- Kingdom: Plantae
- Clade: Embryophytes
- Clade: Tracheophytes
- Clade: Spermatophytes
- Clade: Angiosperms
- Clade: Eudicots
- Order: Santalales
- Family: Loranthaceae
- Genus: Amyema
- Species: A. quandang

Binomial name
- Amyema quandang (Lindl.) Tiegh.

Varieties
- A. quandang var. quandang A. quandang var. bancroftii (Bailey) Barlow
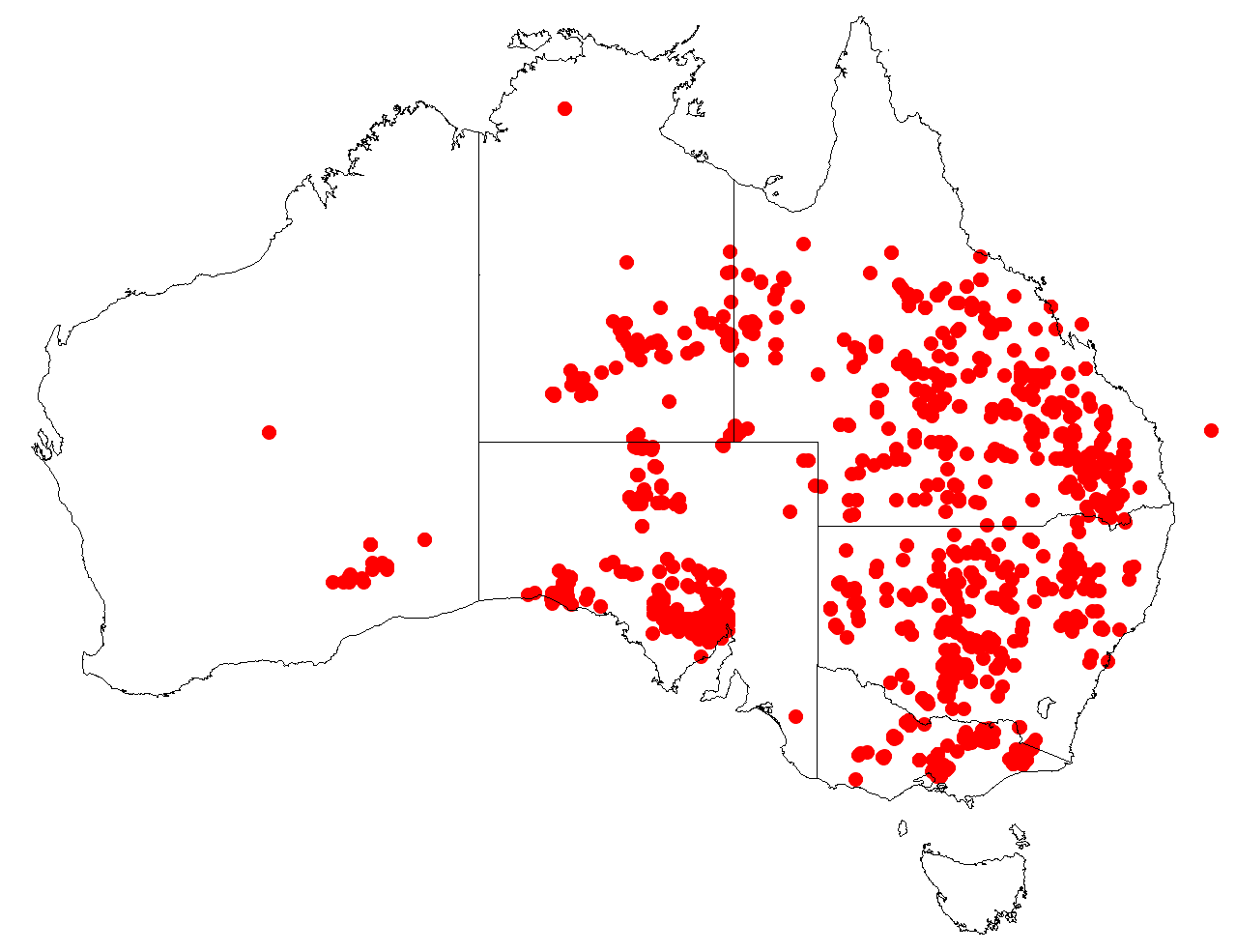
- Collections data for A. quandang from the Australasian Virtual Herbarium

= Amyema quandang =

Species of plant

Amyema quandang is a species of hemi-parasitic shrub which is widespread throughout the mainland of Australia, especially arid inland regions, sometimes referred to as the grey mistletoe.

== Description ==
An aerial shrub, without conventional roots, which attaches to the stems of species of Acacia. The leaves are leathery and greyish, and lanceolate to broadly ovate. Flowers are red, green and grey and appear sometime between April and October. The fruit is a fleshy drupe, between 6 and 10 millimetres long, which contains an oily seed.

== Ecology ==
The plant has a hemi-parasitic relationship with Acacia, it is recorded on: A. aneura, A. cambagei, A. papyrocarpa, A. omalophylla and A. dealbata.

Two species of birds are noted for their interdependence, or mutualism, where they occur with A. quandang in the arid interior of Australia. Nectar from the species provides an important part of the diet of spiny-cheeked honeyeaters Acanthagenys rufogularis, who assist in its pollination. The fruit is consumed by mistletoebirds, Dicaeum hirundinaceum, who disperse the seed; the year round availability of the fruit is ignored by other frugivores.

The hybridisation of this species with Amyema pendula, rare amongst Loranthaceae, has produced first generation hybrids.

== Taxonomy ==
Amyema quandang is member of Santalales, the mistletoe order, placed within the family Loranthaceae. The first publication of the species was made in a note by John Lindley in 1838, describing the plant noted by Thomas Mitchell as growing on Santalum acuminatum, another hemiparasite known as quandong.

May 9. We moved to the pond above-mentioned, named Yambarenga ... and in some places I observed the Quandang bushes,* having their branches covered with a parasitical plant whose bright crimson flowers were very ornamental.**

(*Footnote. Fusanus acuminatus.)
— Lindley, Mitchell, 1838

The description in the genus Loranthus remained until Philippe Édouard Léon Van Tieghem transferred it to the genus Amyema in 1894. The genus name is derived from Greek for 'without' and 'to instruct'.

Two varieties of the species are described, Amyema quandang var. quandang and Amyema quandang var. bancroftii (F.M.Bailey) Barlow, the latter being found in Queensland and New South Wales.

== Host plants ==
The following host plants are known:

List of host plants

Apocynaceae:

Carissa ovata

Caesalpiniaceae:

Bauhinia sp.

Casuarinaceae:

Casuarina sp.

Cupressaceae:

Callitris sp.

Euphorbiaceae:

Mallotus claoxyloides

Meliaceae:

Owenia acidula

Mimosaceae:

Acacia ammobia, Acacia aneura, Acacia argyrodendron, Acacia baileyana, Acacia blakei, Acacia burkittii, Acacia burrowii, Acacia cambagei, Acacia cana, Acacia cheelii, Acacia colletioides, Acacia crassa, Acacia dealbata, Acacia deanei, Acacia decurrens, Acacia doratoxylon, Acacia excelsa, Acacia georginae, Acacia gonoclada, Acacia harpophylla, Acacia homalophylla, Acacia kempeana, Acacia leiocalyx, Acacia loderi, Acacia longispicata, Acacia macdonnelliensis, Acacia mearnsii, Acacia melanoxylon, Acacia neriifolia, Acacia omalophylla, Acacia oswaldii, Acacia papyrocarpa, Acacia pendula, Acacia pycnantha, Acacia rigens, Acacia shirleyi, Acacia silvestris, Acacia sparsiflora, Acacia tetragonophylla, Acacia victoriae

Myoporaceae:

Eremophila mitchellii, Myoporum platycarpum

Myrtaceae:

Eucalyptus lacrimans, Eucalyptus largiflorens, Melaleuca lanceolata

Proteaceae:

Hakea arborescens

Rutaceae:

Flindersia maculosa, Geijera parviflora

Sapindaceae:

Alectryon diversifolius, Alectryon oleifolius

== Image Gallery ==
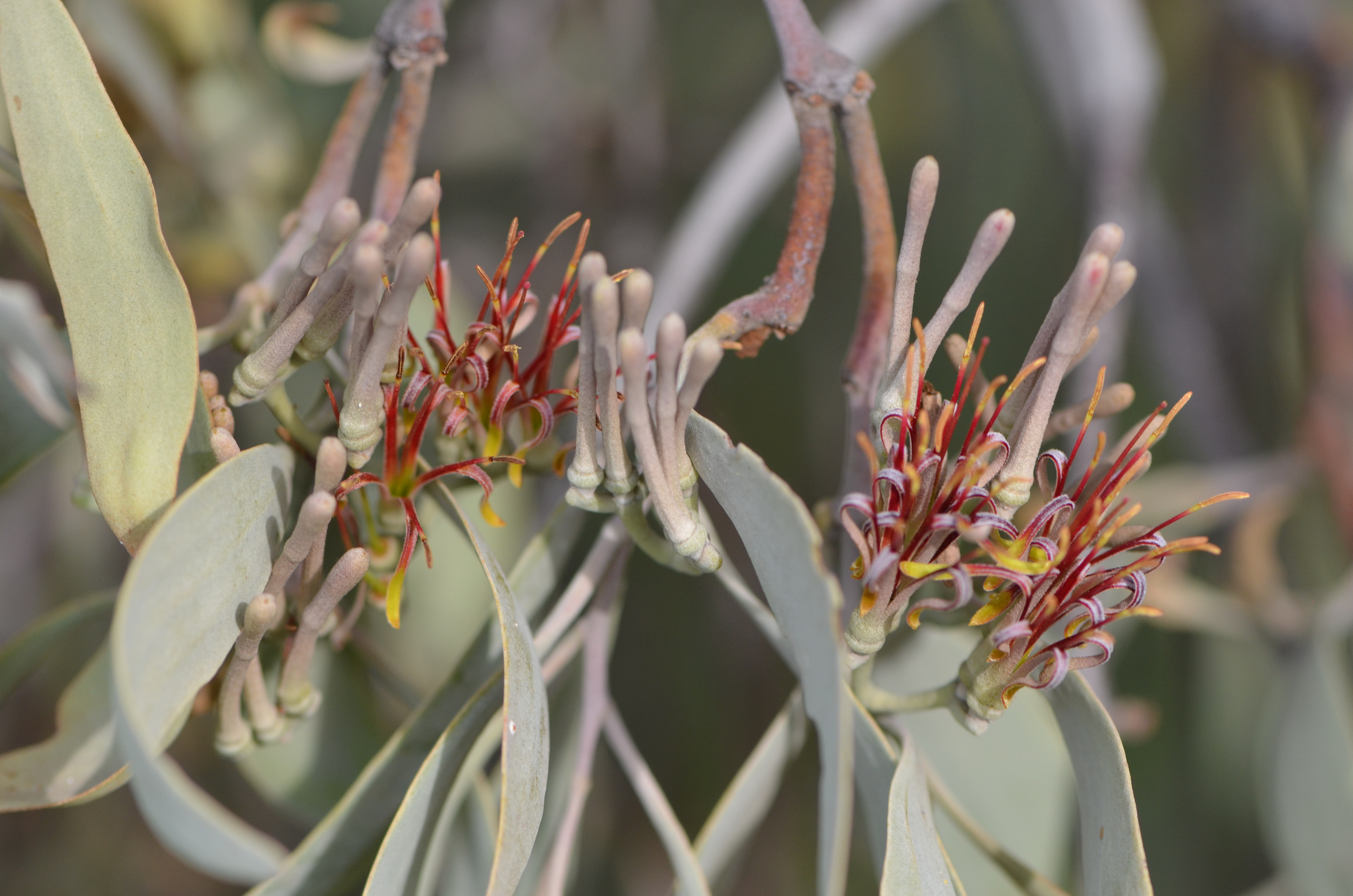

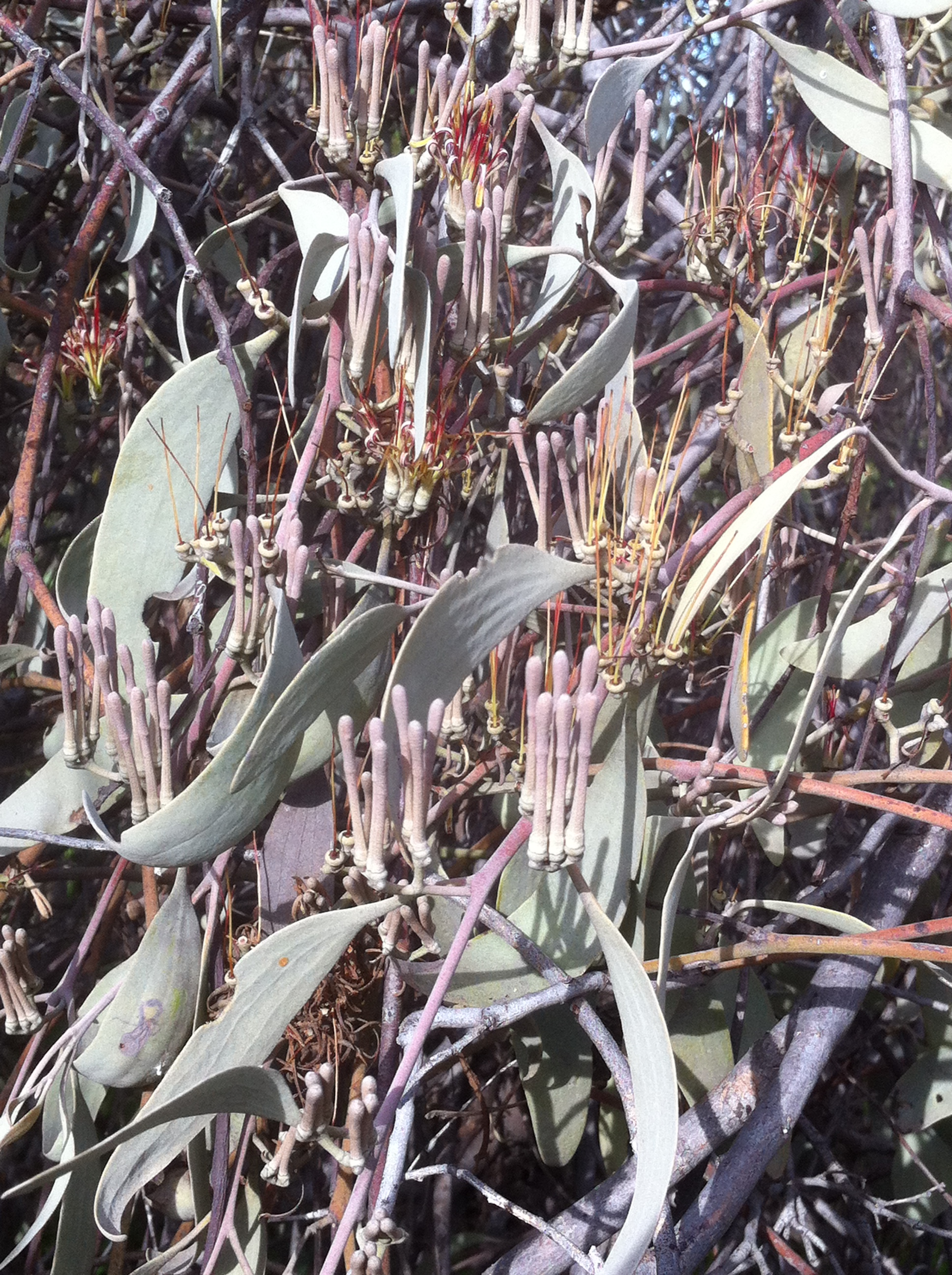

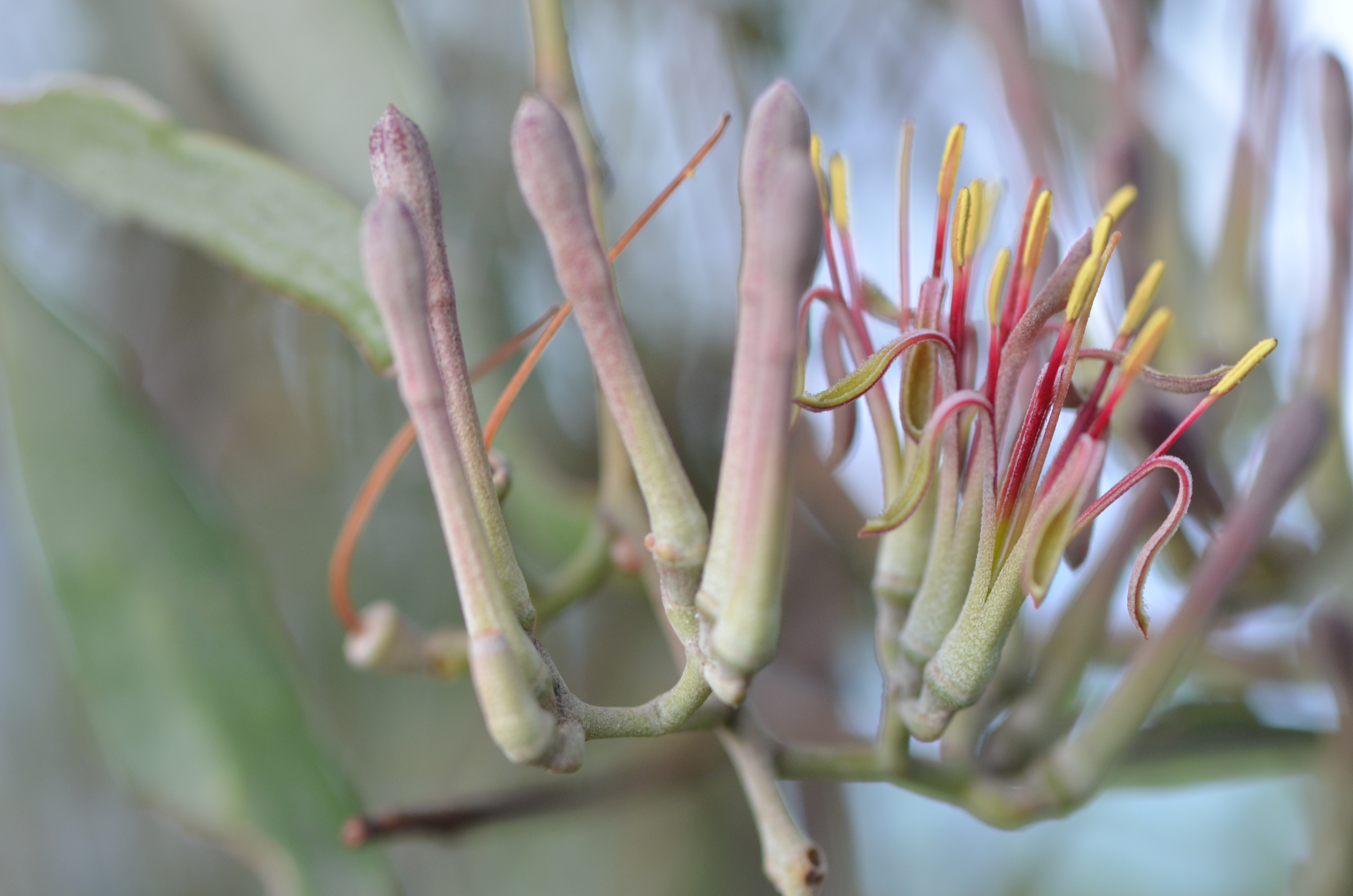

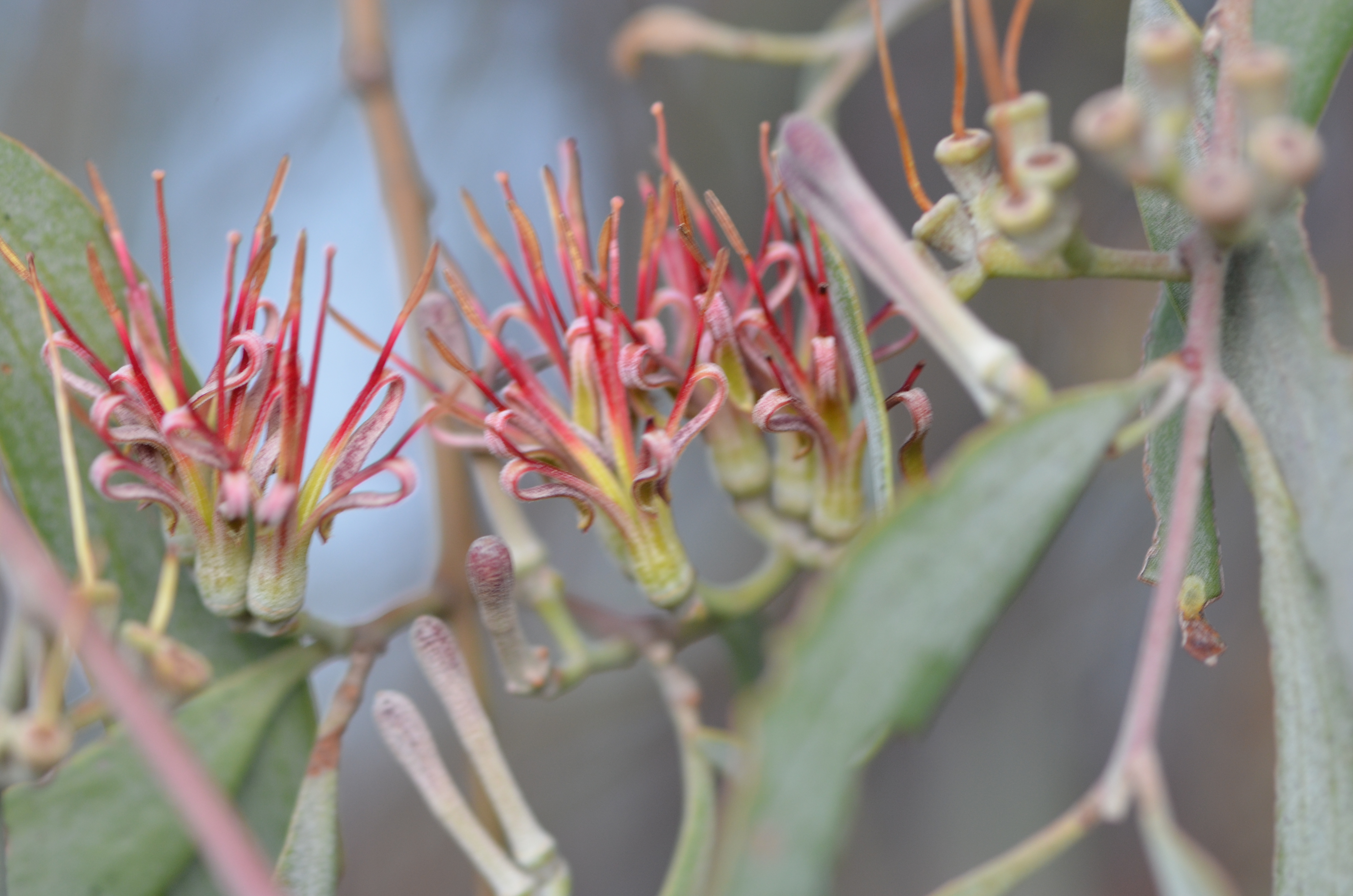

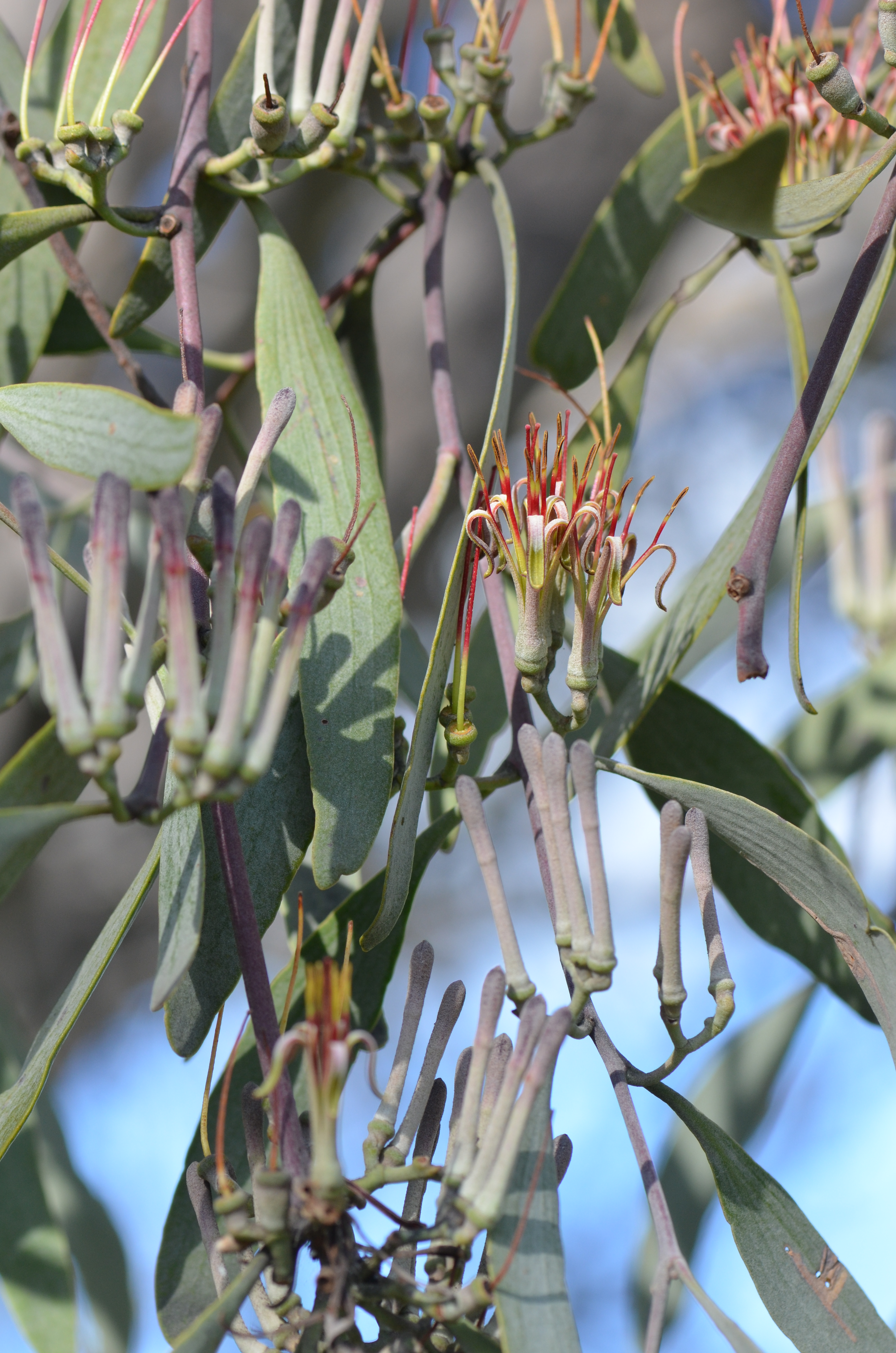
