= Yarran (disambiguation) =

Yarran (Acacia homalophylla) is a species of tree found in the eastern half of Australia.

Yarran may also refer to:

Surname

- Chris Yarran (born 1990), Australian footballer
- Shane Yarran (1989–2018), Australian footballer

Plants

- Bastard yarran, Acacia neriifolia
- Curly yarran, Acacia oswaldii

Places

- Yarran Dheran, nature reserve in Melbourne, Australia

== See also ==
- Yarranton, surname
