= Oleander (disambiguation) =

The oleander is a poisonous plant grown as an ornamental.

Oleander may also refer to:

- The Oleander wattle, tree native to Australia
- Oleander, California, in Fresno County
- MV Oleander, ferry
- Oleander moth, Syntomeida epilais
- Oleander hawk-moth, Daphnis nerii
- Oleander-Rennen, German horse race
- Oleander (band), American post-grunge band, or their debut EP
- Matt Oleander, a fictional character in Degrassi: The Next Generation
- Morceau Oleander, a fictional character in Psychonauts
- Oleander, one of the main characters in the video game Them's Fightin' Herds.

== See also ==
- White Oleander, 1999 coming-of-age novel by Janet Fitch
- White Oleander (film), 2002 drama film based on the aforementioned novel
