= Red wattle =

Red wattle may refer to:

== Animals ==
- Red Wattle hog, domestic pig breed

== Plants ==
- Acacia crassicarpa, a tree native to Australia (Queensland), West Papua (Indonesia) and Papua New Guinea
- Acacia flavescens, a tree in the genus Acacia native to eastern Australia
- Acacia monticola, a species of plant in the legume family that is native to Australia
- Acacia silvestris, a tree in the genus Acacia native to southeastern Australia

== See also ==
- Red wattlebird, a honeyeater also known as Barkingbird or Gillbird
- Red-wattled lapwing, a lapwing or large plover, a wader in the family Charadriidae
- Red stem wattle, Acacia myrtifolia, also known as a myrtle wattle
