= Yarranton =

Yarranton is an English surname. Notable people with this name include:

- Peter Yarranton, chairman of the United Kingdom Sports Council from 1989 to 1994, and a notable figure
- Andrew Yarranton, English engineer in the 17th century

== See also ==
- Yarran
