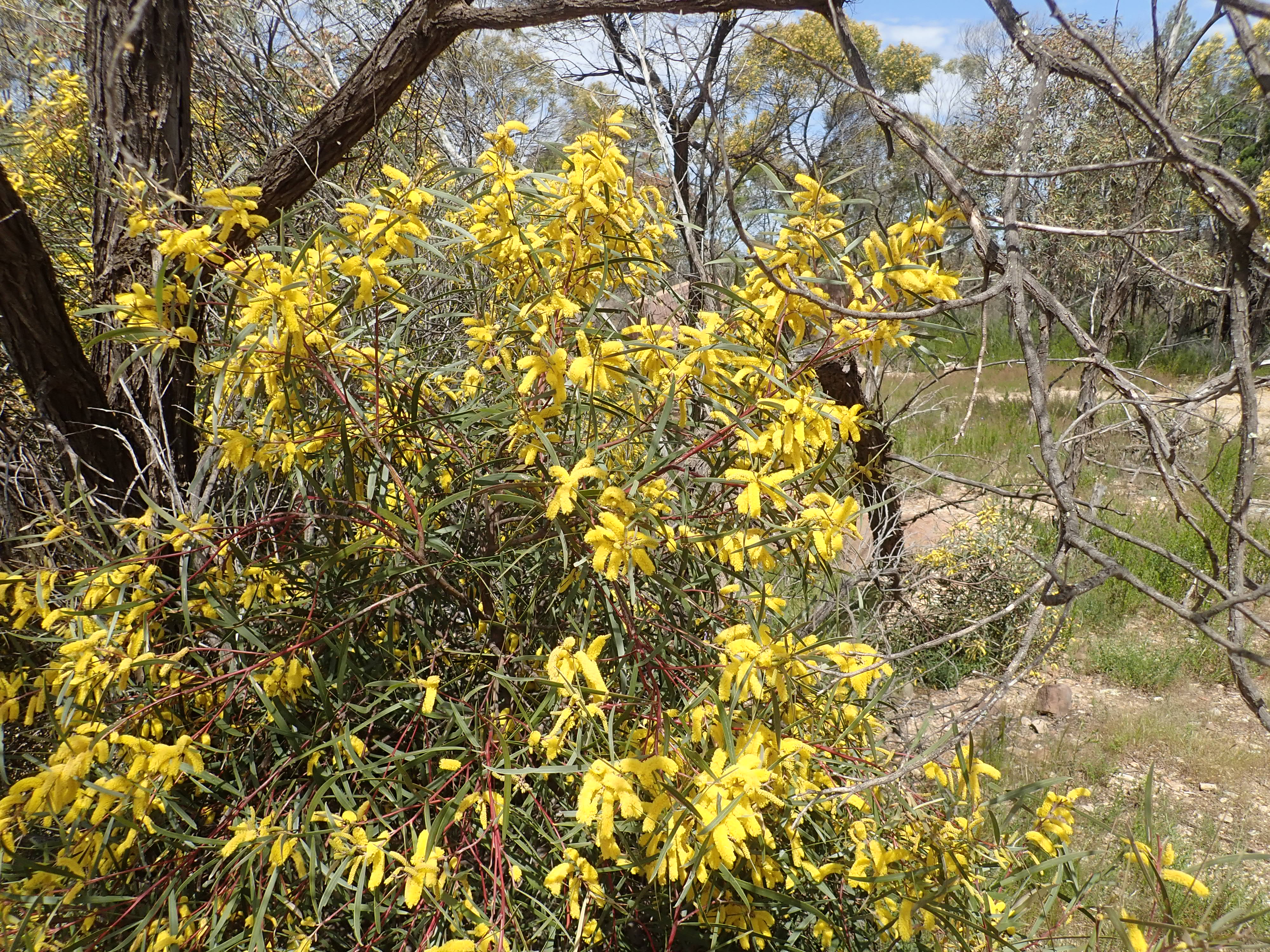

Scientific classification
- Kingdom: Plantae
- Clade: Tracheophytes
- Clade: Angiosperms
- Clade: Eudicots
- Clade: Rosids
- Order: Fabales
- Family: Fabaceae
- Subfamily: Caesalpinioideae
- Clade: Mimosoid clade
- Genus: Acacia
- Species: A. doratoxylon

Binomial name
- Acacia doratoxylon A.Cunn.
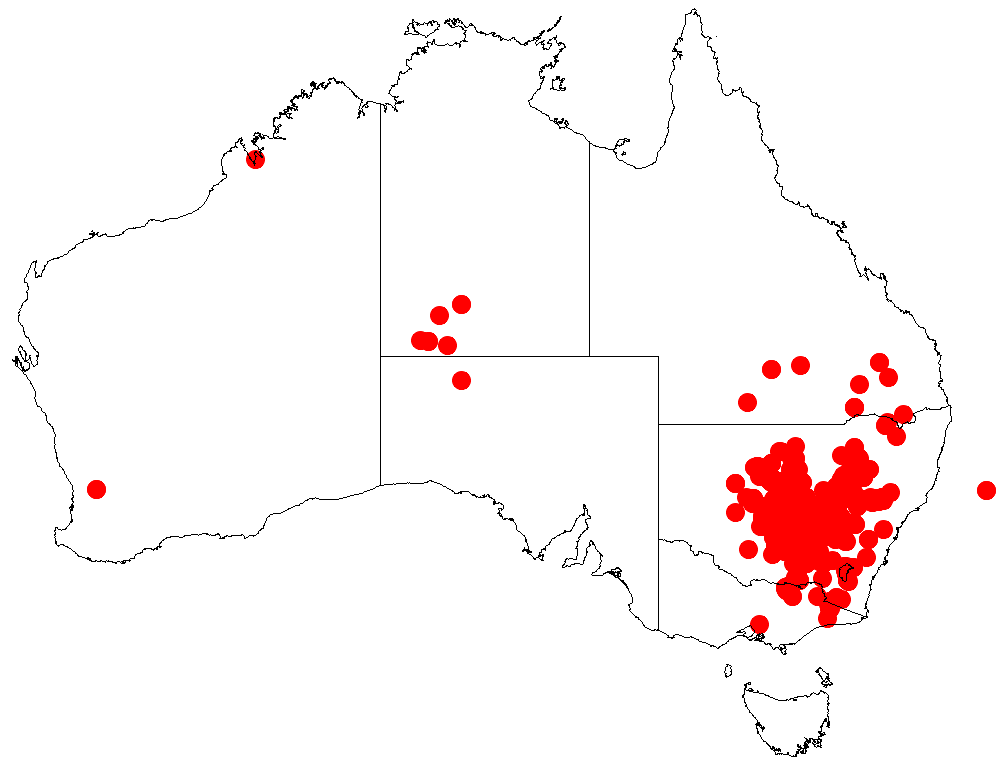
- Occurrence data from AVH

Synonyms
- Acacia doratoxylon A.Cunn. var. doratoxylon; Racosperma doratoxylon (A.Cunn.) Pedley; Acacia doratoxylon auct. non A.Cunn.: Meisner, C.D.F. (1844)

= Acacia doratoxylon =

Currawang

Species of plant

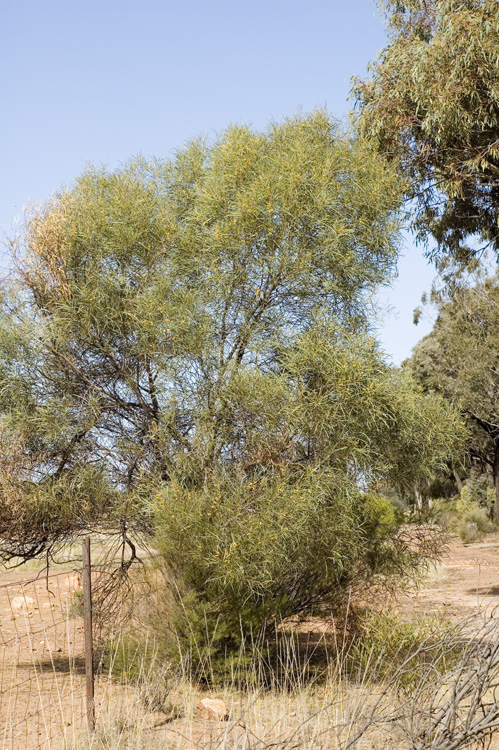
Habit near West Wyalong

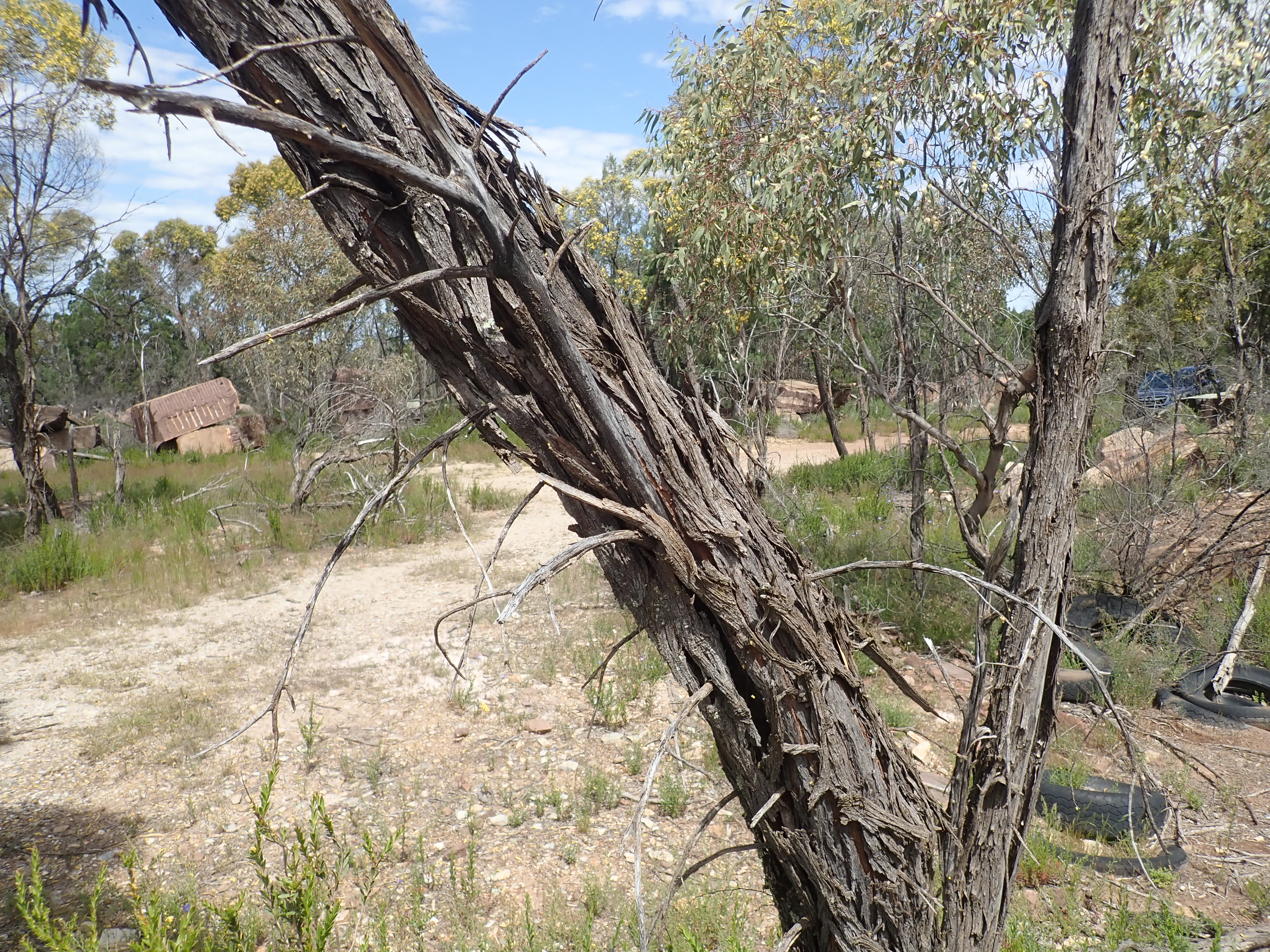
Bark

Acacia doratoxylon, commonly known as currawang, lancewood, spearwood coast myall, or other names is a species of flowering plant in the family Fabaceae and is endemic to continental south-eastern Australia. It is a singled-stemmed shrub or tree with corrugated bark, linear phyllodes, spikes of golden yellow flowers and linear, wrinkled, more or less leathery pods.

== Description ==
Acacia doratoxylon is a single-stemmed shrub or tree that typically grows to a height of 3–10 m (9.8–32.8 ft) and has corrugated dark greyish brown to black bark on the trunk. Its branchlets are glabrous, yellow-brown to red-brown and resinous. The phyllodes are linear, flat, mostly straight to slightly curved, 70–120 mm (2.8–4.7 in) long, 2–8 mm (0.079–0.315 in) wide, glabrous and leathery with one prominent and usually two less prominent veins. The flowers are golden yellow and borne in spikes mostly 20–35 mm (0.79–1.38 in) long in racemes 2–15 mm (0.079–0.591 in) long. Flowering occurs between August and September the north and September to November in the south. The pods are linear, slightly resembling a string of beads, 50–100 mm (2.0–3.9 in) long, more or less leathery, glabrous and wrinkled. The seeds are elliptic to oblong, 3–5 mm (0.12–0.20 in) long and black.

== Taxonomy ==
Acacia doratoxylon was first formally described in 1825 by the botanist Allan Cunningham in the chapter On the Botany of the Blue Mountains in Barron Field's Geographical Memoirs on New South Wales. The specific epithet (doratoxylon) is from the Greek dory- doratos meaning 'spear' and xylon meaning 'wood', in reference to the use of the wood by Indigenous Australian groups including the Koori peoples to manufacture spears from the wood.

== Distribution and habitat ==
Currawang is endemic to central parts of New South Wales, the Australian Capital Territory and Victoria. It is fairly common on the western slopes of the Great Dividing Range and plains of New South Wales and its range extends through the southern tablelands through the Australian Capital Territory and across Ovens Range in Victoria. In New South Wales it is found as far east as Wollemi spreading as far west as the Ivanhoe District and as far north as Brewarrina. It is found on rocky ridges where it is associated with Eucalyptus and Callitris woodland communities and on red sandy plains where it is often part of mallee communities. In Victoria it is considered rare and has a small disjunct distribution in the East Gippsland Uplands and the northern inland slopes in the Barambogie Range close to Beechworth and around Suggan Buggan where it grows on rocky well-drained hillsides and ridges.

== Conservation status ==
Acacia doratoxylon is listed as "endangered" in Victoria under the Victorian Government Flora and Fauna Guarantee Act 1988.

== Uses ==
A. doratoxylon can be used for land rehabilitation and can grow quickly in rocky soils that are prone to erosion and on recharge areas. It is also nitrogen fixing which will increase soil fertility and makes a suitable habitat for native species. It produces pollen prolifically which is a good food source for native moths, butterflies and insects, attracting insectivorous birds. Other birds including native pigeons and parrots consume the seeds. The timber is a good fuel and produces a hot fire. The dark brown wood is dense and very hard and heavy and used to manufacture for furniture. Indigenous Australians used it to make spears. The foliage is used as fodder for stock during times of drought.

=== Use in horticulture ===
The plant is widely available for cultivation in seeds form although seeds need to be scarified or treated with boiling water prior to sowing. It prefers a well-drained and reasonably dry position and is frost tolerant. It is often planted as a good screen plant in its rounded shrub form and makes a suitable hedge or windbreak.

== See also ==
- List of Acacia species
