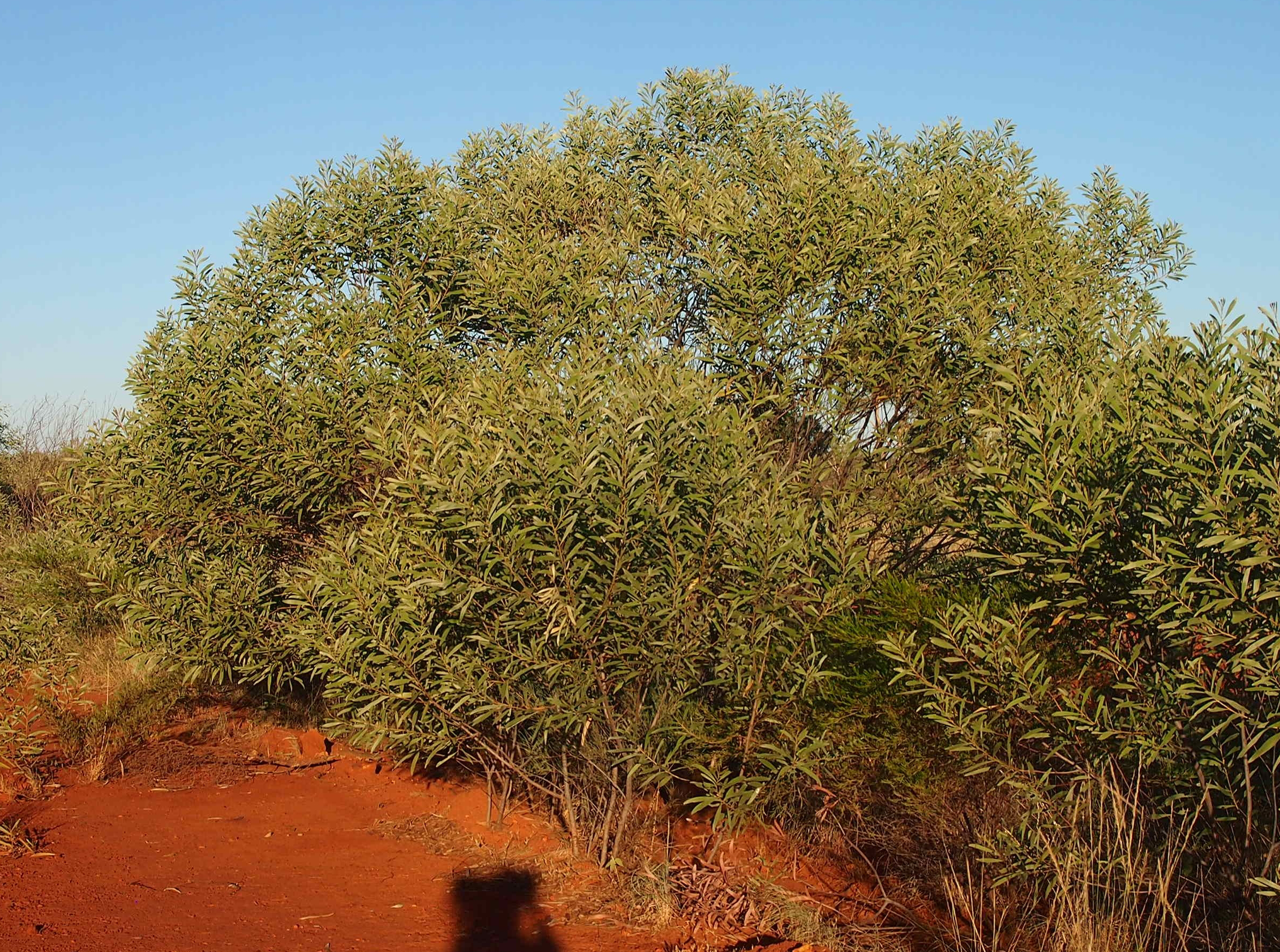

Scientific classification
- Kingdom: Plantae
- Clade: Tracheophytes
- Clade: Angiosperms
- Clade: Eudicots
- Clade: Rosids
- Order: Fabales
- Family: Fabaceae
- Subfamily: Caesalpinioideae
- Clade: Mimosoid clade
- Genus: Acacia
- Species: A. gonoclada

Binomial name
- Acacia gonoclada F.Muell.
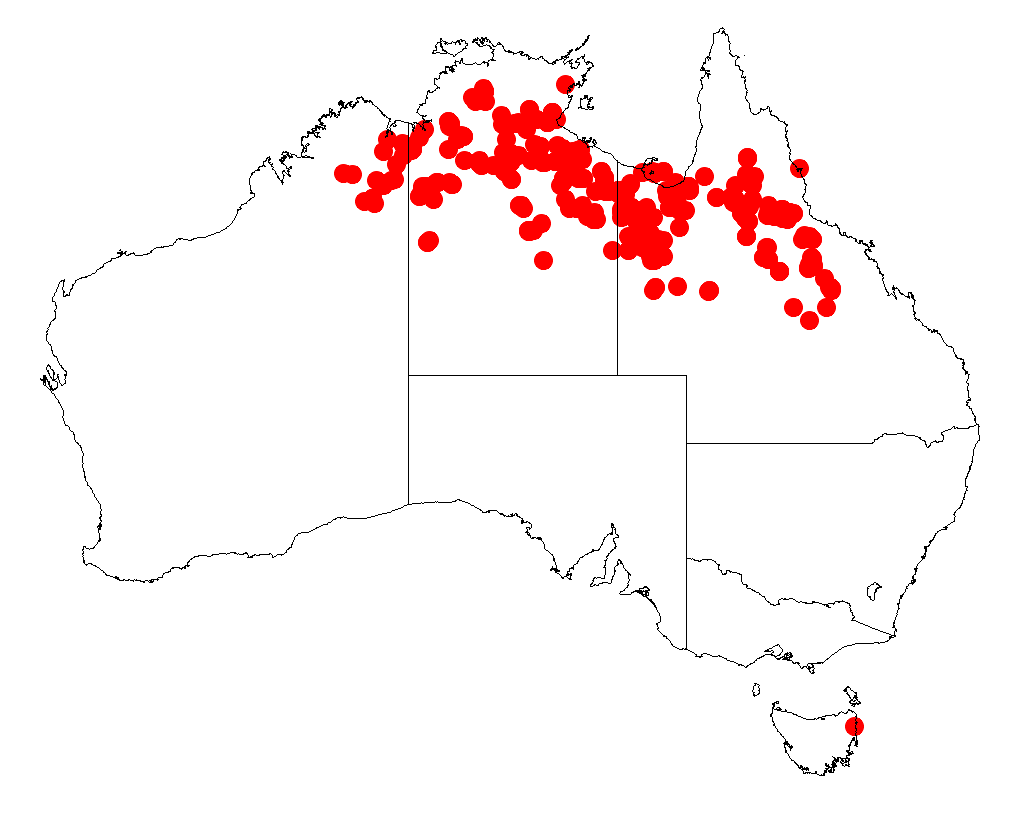
- Occurrence data from AVH

Synonyms
- Racosperma gonocladum (F.Muell.) Pedley; Acacia leptostachya auct. non Benth.: Maiden, J.H. (1918)

= Acacia gonoclada =

Ganambureng

Species of legume

Acacia gonoclada, also known as ganambureng, is a species of flowering plant in the family Fabaceae and is endemic to northern Australia. It is a shrub or small tree with smooth bark, erect, narrowly elliptic phyllodes, spikes of bright yellow flowers and clustered of linear pods, slightly constricted between the seeds.

== Description ==
Acacia gonoclada is a shrub or tree that typically grows to a height of up to 4 m (13 ft) and has smooth red-brown or grey bark. Its branchlets are olive green or brown, its four angles raised and yellowish. The phyllodes are narrowly elliptic or lance-shaped with the narrower end towards the base, flat, 50–135 mm (2.0–5.3 in) long and 8–33 mm (0.31–1.30 in) wide, narrowed and curved upwards near the base. There are two or three conspicuous main veins and a prominent gland near the base of the phyllodes. The flowers are bright yellow and arranged in one or two spikes or in panicles 10–50 mm (0.39–1.97 in) long. Flowering occurs from May to July, and the pods are clustered in upper axils, linear and flat, 20–60 mm (0.79–2.36 in) long, thin, glabrous and sticky, slightly constricted between the seeds. The seeds are oblong or broadly elliptic, 3–4 mm (0.12–0.16 in) long and black.

== Taxonomy ==
Acacia gonoclada was first formally described in 1859 by the botanist Ferdinand von Mueller in the Journal of the Proceedings of the Linnean Society, Botany. The specific epithet (gonoclada) means 'an angle branch or shoot'.

== Distribution ==
Ganambureng is widespread north of 21°S in Australia. It is found in the Central Kimberley bioregion of Western Australia, the north of the Northern Territory and northern Queensland, usually in shallow sandy soils, although on more loamy soils south of Charters Towers.

== See also ==
- List of Acacia species
