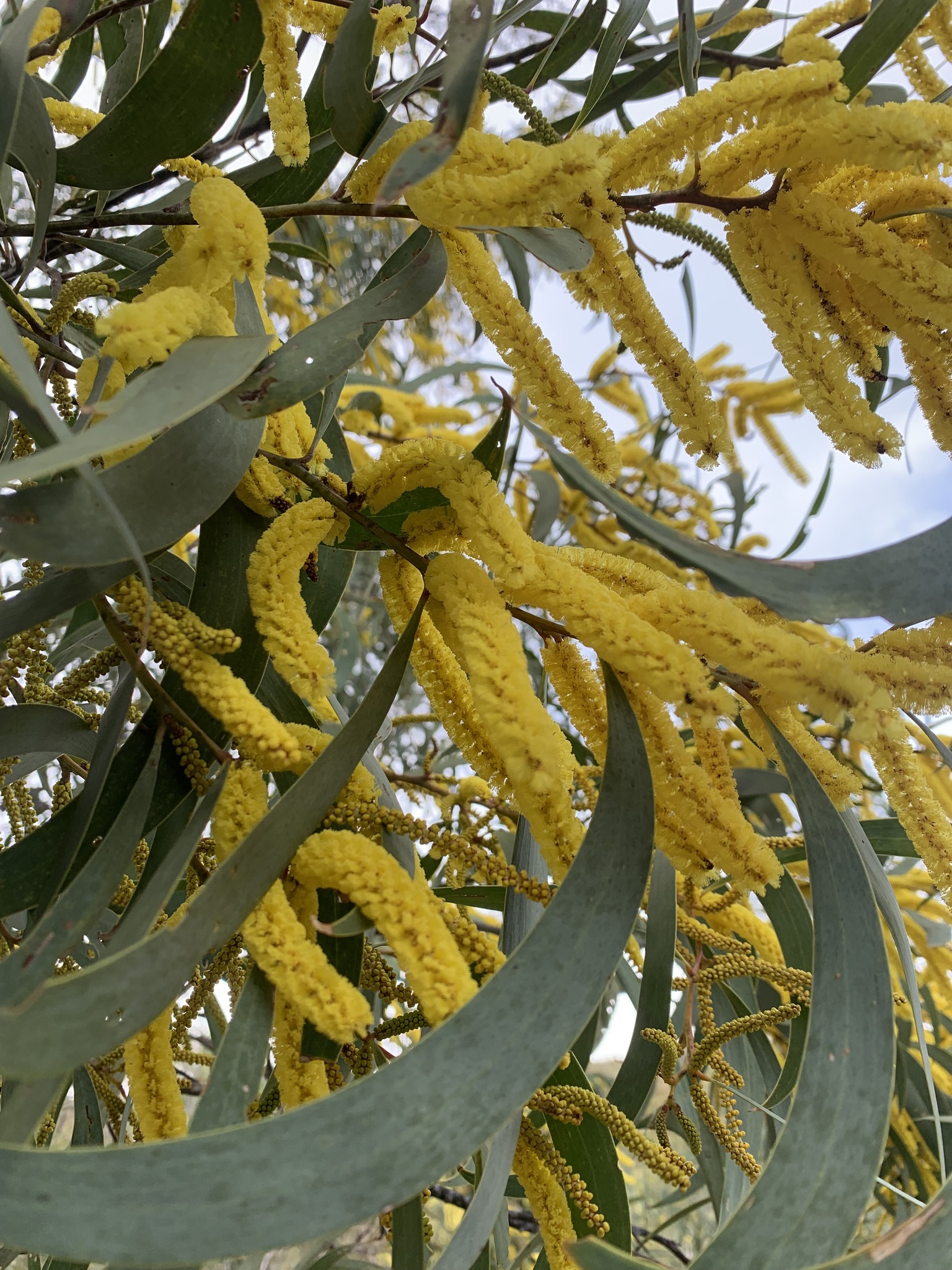

Scientific classification
- Kingdom: Plantae
- Clade: Tracheophytes
- Clade: Angiosperms
- Clade: Eudicots
- Clade: Rosids
- Order: Fabales
- Family: Fabaceae
- Subfamily: Caesalpinioideae
- Clade: Mimosoid clade
- Genus: Acacia
- Species: A. cheelii

Binomial name
- Acacia cheelii Blakely
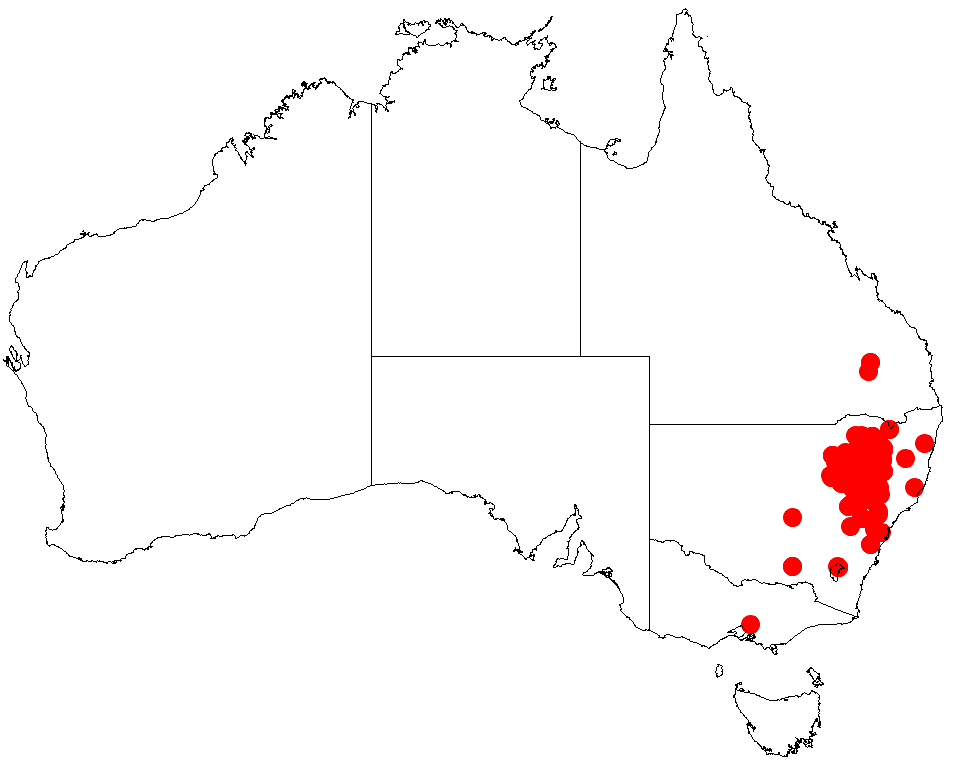
- Occurrence data from AVH

Synonyms
- Racosperma cheelii (Blakely) Pedley

= Acacia cheelii =

Motherumbah

Species of legume

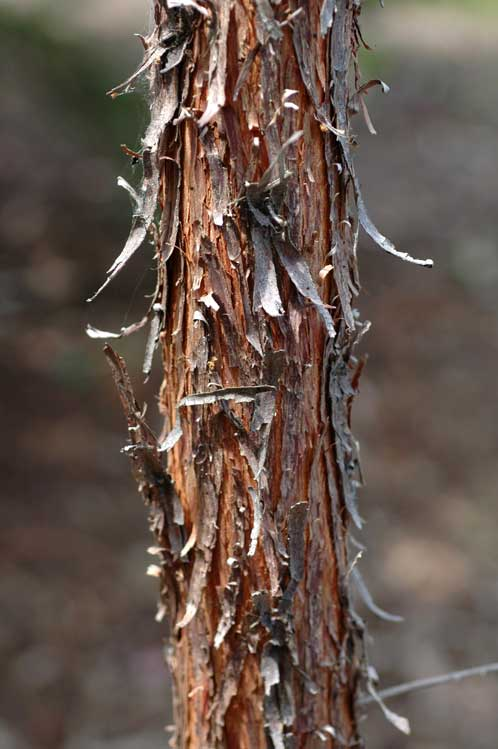
Bark

Acacia cheelii, commonly known as motherumbah or motherumbung, is a species of flowering plant in the family Fabaceae and is endemic to New South Wales, Australia. It is a tree with ribbony or flaky bark, mostly very narrowly elliptic, curved phyllodes, spikes of bright yellow flowers and linear, more or less woody to leathery pods.

== Description ==
Acacia cheelii is a slender, glaucous tree that typically grows up to 10 m (33 ft) high and has mostly blackish to grey, ribbony or flaky bark. Its branchlets are reddish brown or brown, glabrous and often with a whitish, powdery bloom. The phyllodes are mostly very narrowly elliptic, curved and flat, mostly 100–160 mm (3.9–6.3 in) long, 10–18 mm (0.39–0.71 in) wide and leathery with three to six more or less prominent main veins. The flowers are bright yellow and borne in up to three spikes 30–62 mm (1.2–2.4 in) long in axils on peduncles 1–4 mm (0.039–0.157 in) long. Flowering occurs between August and November and the pods are linear, more or less woody to firmly papery to leathery, 50–110 mm (2.0–4.3 in) long and 3–5 mm (0.12–0.20 in) wide. The seeds are brownish black, oblong to narrowly oblong or elliptic, 3.7–6.7 mm (0.15–0.26 in) long.

== Taxonomy ==
Acacia cheelii was first formally described in 1917 by William Blakely in Proceedings of the Linnean Society of New South Wales from specimens collected in Manilla in 1916. The specific epithet honours Edwin Cheel who once worked for the National Herbarium of New South Wales.

== Distribution and habitat ==
Motherumbah mainly occurs on the north-western plains and slopes of the Great Dividing Range in New South Wales and it also found near Murrurundi in the Hunter Valley region and west to the Warrumbungle Mountain and Pilliga Scrub, and north to Warialda and Torrington. There is also a population in the Glen Davis-Capertee district. It grows on rocky or stony hilltops and hillsides in skeletal or sandy soils in Eucalyptus woodland or scrubland.

== See also ==
- List of Acacia species
