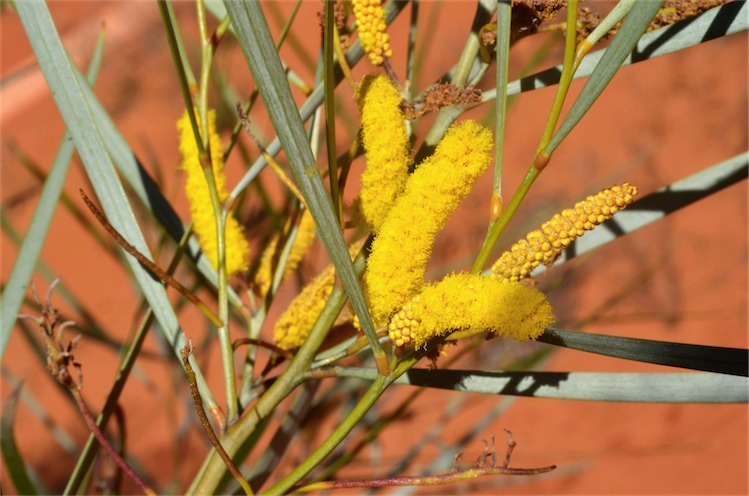

Conservation status
- Least Concern (IUCN 3.1)

Scientific classification
- Kingdom: Plantae
- Clade: Tracheophytes
- Clade: Angiosperms
- Clade: Eudicots
- Clade: Rosids
- Order: Fabales
- Family: Fabaceae
- Subfamily: Caesalpinioideae
- Clade: Mimosoid clade
- Genus: Acacia
- Species: A. ammobia

Binomial name
- Acacia ammobia Maconochie
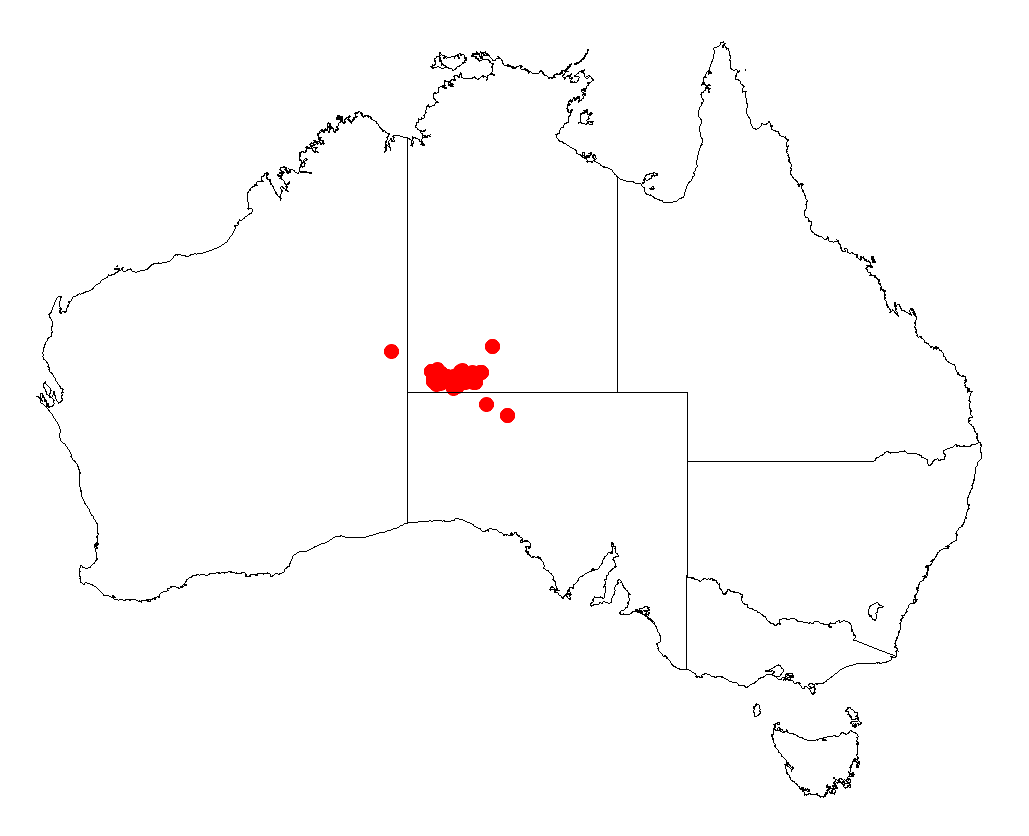

Synonyms
- Racosperma ammobium (Maconochie) Pedley

= Acacia ammobia =

Mount Connor wattle

Species of plant

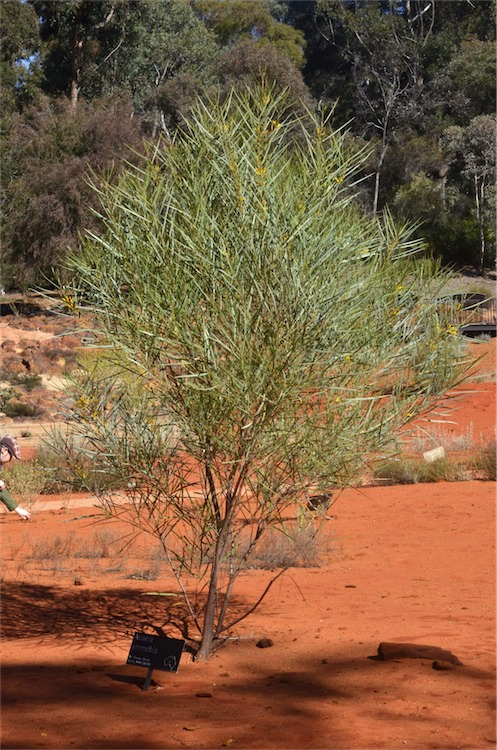
Habit in the Australian National Botanic Gardens

Acacia ammobia, commonly known as the Mount Connor wattle, or Mount Conner wattle, is a species of flowering plant in the family Fabaceae and is endemic to areas near the border between South Australia and the Northern Territory. It is a shrub or small tree with linear phyllodes, flowers arranged in 1 or 2 spikes on side shoots, each spike with densely crowded yellow flowers. The fruit is a linear pods 55–110 mm (2.2–4.3 in) long with dar brown seeds.

== Description ==
Acacia ammobia is a shrub or small tree that typically grows to 1.5–7 m (4 ft 11 in – 23 ft 0 in) high and has fibrous bark. Its phyllodes are linear, flat, 110–270 mm (4.3–10.6 in) long, 4–9 mm (0.16–0.35 in) wide and leathery, tapering at both ends. There is a conspicuous gland 1–3 mm (0.039–0.118 in) from the base of the phyllode. The flowers are yellow, and arranged in 1 or 2 densely flowered, cylindrical spikes 20–50 mm (0.79–1.97 in) long. Flowering occurs from August to October, and the fruit is a dark brown, leathery, linear pod, 55–110 mm (2.2–4.3 in) long and 2–3 mm (0.079–0.118 in) wide containing dark brown, flattened seeds 3–4 mm (0.12–0.16 in) long.

== Taxonomy ==
Acacia ammobia was first formally described by the botanist John Maconochie in 1978 in the Journal of the Adelaide Botanic Gardens from specimens he collected about 30 km (19 mi) east of Ayers Rock in 1972. The specific epithet (ammobia) is a Latin word meaning 'sand dweller'.

== Distribution and habitat ==
Mount Conner wattle is found in arid parts of inland Australia where it has a limited distribution in the north-western parts of South Australia and southern parts of the Northern Territory between 130 km (81 mi) and 50 km (31 mi) west of Uluru, where it is often grows on the upper slopes of hills and ranges in sandy or gravelly soils on upper slopes of ranges.

== See also ==
- List of Acacia species
