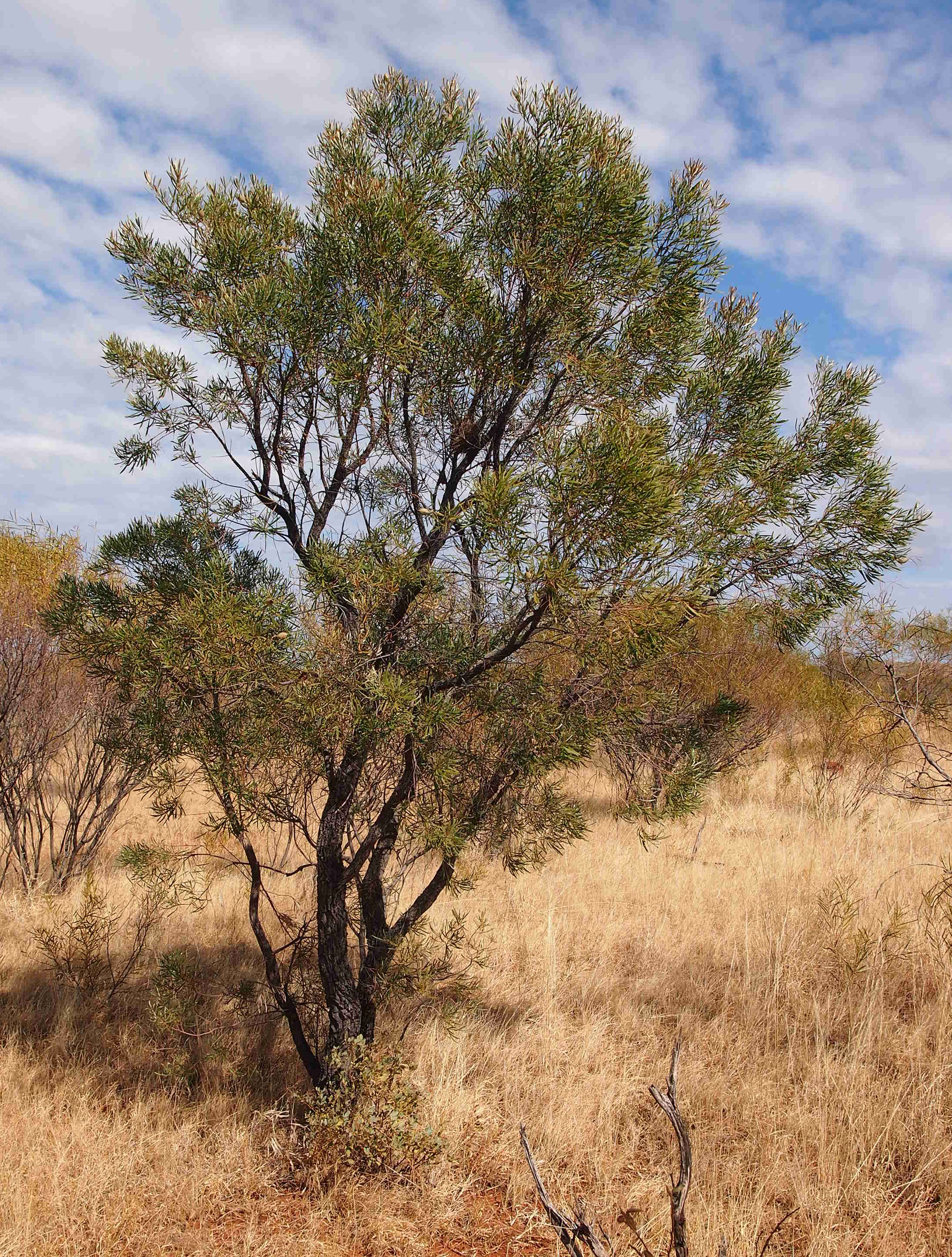

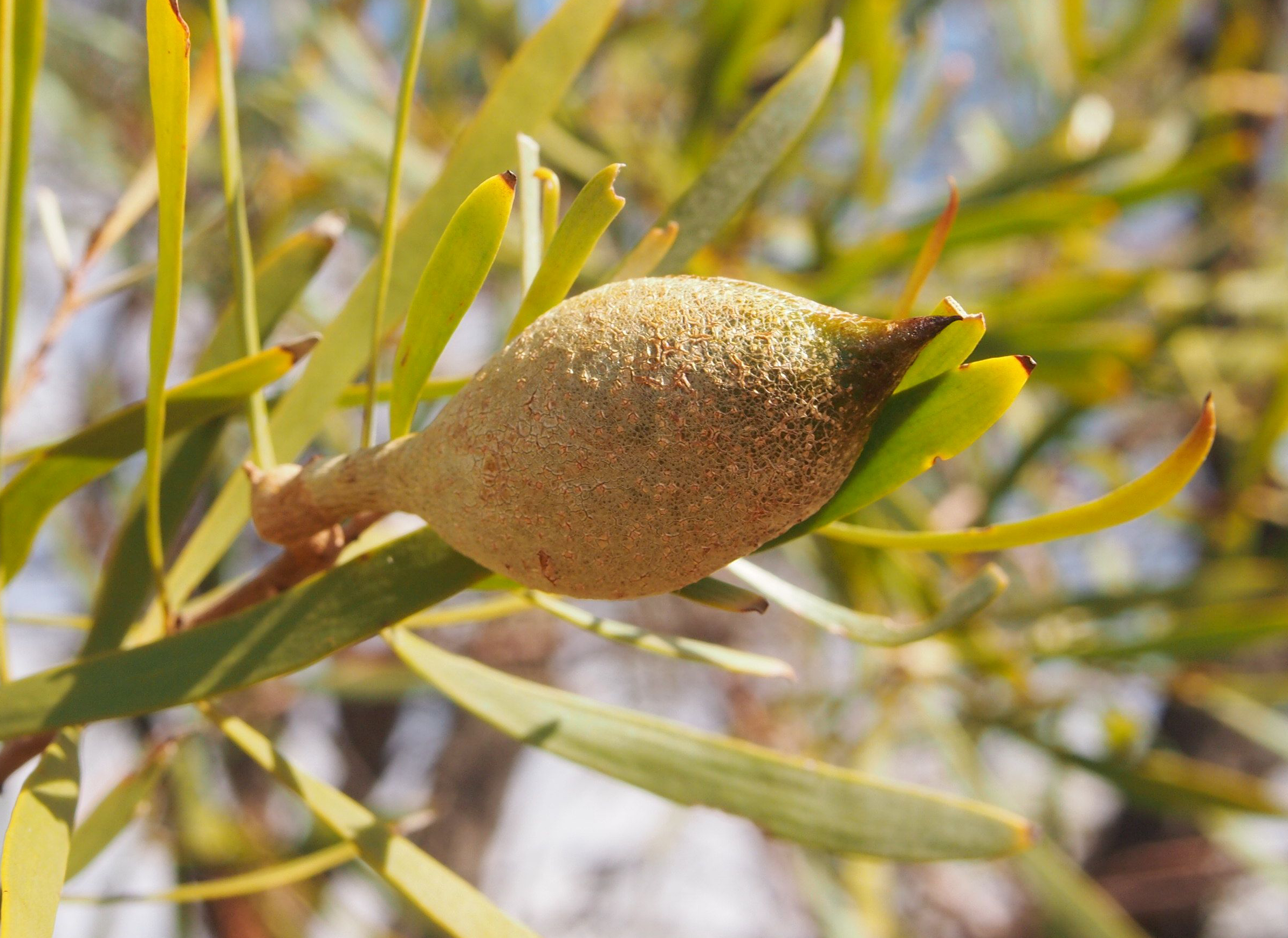

Scientific classification
- Kingdom: Plantae
- Clade: Tracheophytes
- Clade: Angiosperms
- Clade: Eudicots
- Order: Proteales
- Family: Proteaceae
- Genus: Hakea
- Species: H. arborescens

Binomial name
- Hakea arborescens R.Br.
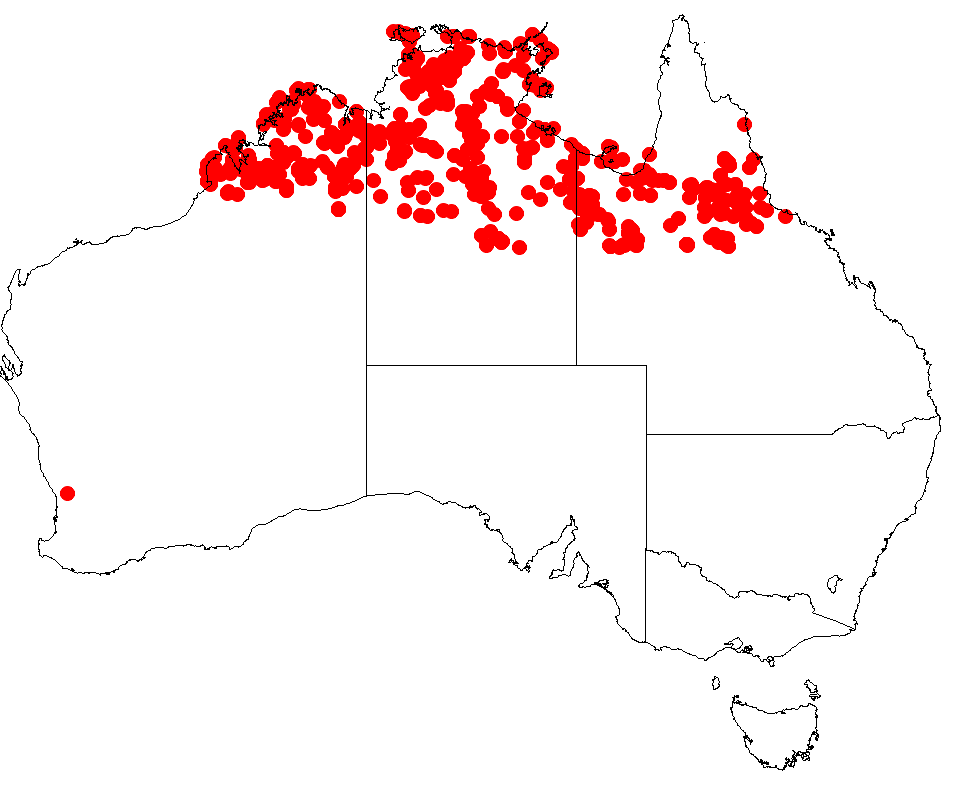
- Occurrence data from Australasian Virtual Herbarium

= Hakea arborescens =

Common Hakea

Species of plant native to Australia

Hakea arborescens, commonly known as the common hakea or the yellow hakea, is a shrub or tree of the genus Hakea native to parts of northern Australia.

== Description ==
The tall shrub or tree typically grows to a height of 2 to 8 metres (6.6 to 26.2 ft). The bark on the trunk and larger branches is rough, fissured and grey in colour. The sessile evergreen leaves have a linear to narrowly oblanceolate or narrowly elliptic shape and are 5 to 18 centimetres (2 to 7 in) in length and 3 to 11 millimetres (0.118 to 0.433 in) wide. It blooms from January to July and produce yellow-cream flowers. Each axillary unbranched inflorescence is 30 to 50 mm (1.2 to 2.0 in) long and clustered in heads. It has a free, silvery to rusty coloured perianth and a conical pollen presenter. The thick woody beaked fruit that form after flowering are an ellipsoidal shape 28 to 58 mm (1.1 to 2.3 in) in length and 14 to 26 mm (0.6 to 1.0 in) across. The fruits contain two obovoid shaped black seeds that are 10 to 15 mm (0.39 to 0.59 in) in length with a membranous yellow wing.

== Taxonomy ==
Hakea arborescens was first formally described by botanist Robert Brown in 1810 as part of the work On the natural order of plants called Proteaceae as published in Transactions of the Linnean Society of London. The specific epithet (arborescens) is derived from the Latin meaning "becoming tree-like" referring to the habit of the shrub.

== Distribution ==
Hakea arborescens is endemic to the top end in the Northern Territory, the Kimberley region of Western Australia and northern Queensland. It is often found among coastal dunes, inland on soils that are alkaline, along creek banks or in low-lying areas such as swamps. Hakea arborescens is often found growing over and around areas of sandstone, quartzite and limestone and usually part of monsoon forest or Eucalyptus woodland communities.
