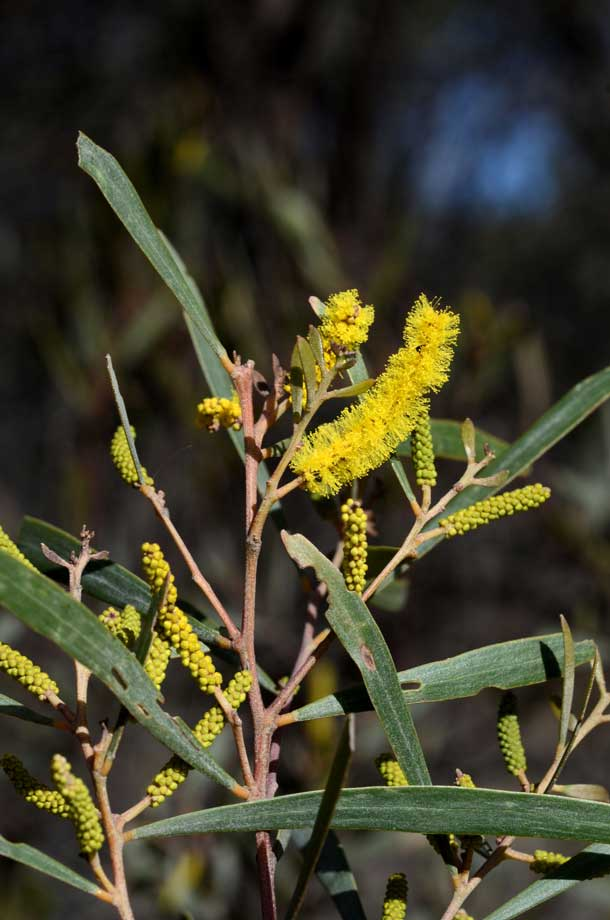

Scientific classification
- Kingdom: Plantae
- Clade: Tracheophytes
- Clade: Angiosperms
- Clade: Eudicots
- Clade: Rosids
- Order: Fabales
- Family: Fabaceae
- Subfamily: Caesalpinioideae
- Clade: Mimosoid clade
- Genus: Acacia
- Species: A. burrowii

Binomial name
- Acacia burrowii Maiden
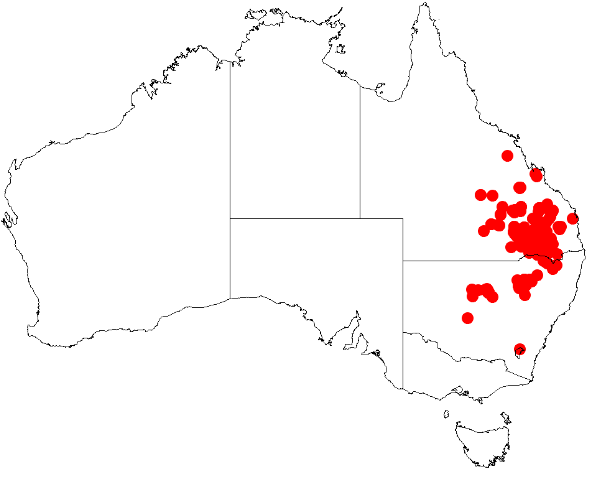
- Occurrence data from AVH

Synonyms
- Acacia burrowi Maiden orth. var.; Racosperma burrowii (Maiden) Pedley

= Acacia burrowii =

Burrow's wattle

Species of legume

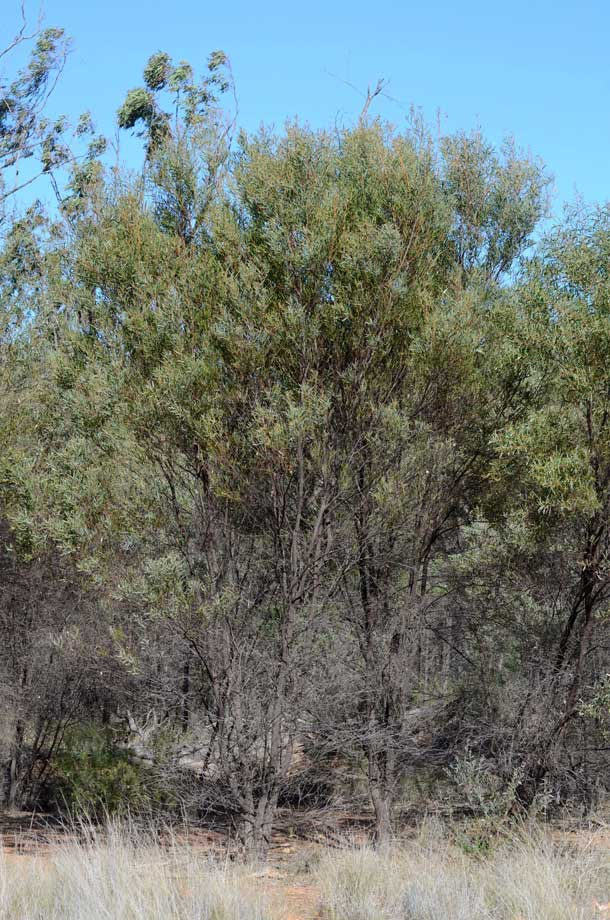
Habit near Moonie

Acacia burrowii, commonly known as Burrow's wattle, is a species of flowering plant in the family Fabaceae and is endemic to eastern Australia. It is a tree with ribbony, grey bark, leathery narrowly elliptic to very narrowly elliptic phyllodes, spikes of golden yellow flowers, and linear, glabrous, thinly leathery to crust-like pods.

== Description ==
Acacia burrowii is a tree that typically grows to a height up to 13 m (43 ft), and has grey, ribbony bark. Its branchlets are scaly, glabrous, reddish-brown and slightly sticky. The phyllodes are narrowly to very narrowly elliptic, leathery, flat, mostly 30–110 mm (1.2–4.3 in) long and 4–10 mm (0.16–0.39 in) wide and up to three prominent main veins. The flowers are golden-yellow and borne in spikes 15–30 mm (0.59–1.18 in) long on racemes 1–5 mm (0.039–0.197 in) long. Flowering occurs between July and October and the pods are straight or slightly curved, thinly leathery to crust-like, 40–110 mm (1.6–4.3 in) long and slightly constricted between the seeds. The seeds are dark brown to black, and oblong to elliptic.

== Taxonomy ==
Acacia burrowii was first formally described in 1920 by Joseph Maiden from specimens collected by "Gordon Burrow" in the Pilliga forest. The specific epithet (burrowii) honours Robert John Gordon Burrow, (known as Gordon Burrow), a forester in the Narrabri area.

== Distribution and habitat ==
This species of wattle grows in woodland and forest, sometimes in dense scrub, often on stony hillsides in north western New South Wales and south eastern Queensland. It is found on the plains between Cobar and Nyngan and north to Yetman and the Pilliga Scrub. In Queensland it occurs from around Goondiwindi and Moonie and north to around Eidsvold.

== Conservation status ==
Acacia burrowii is listed as of "least concern" under the Queensland Government Nature Conservation Act 1992.

== See also ==
- List of Acacia species
