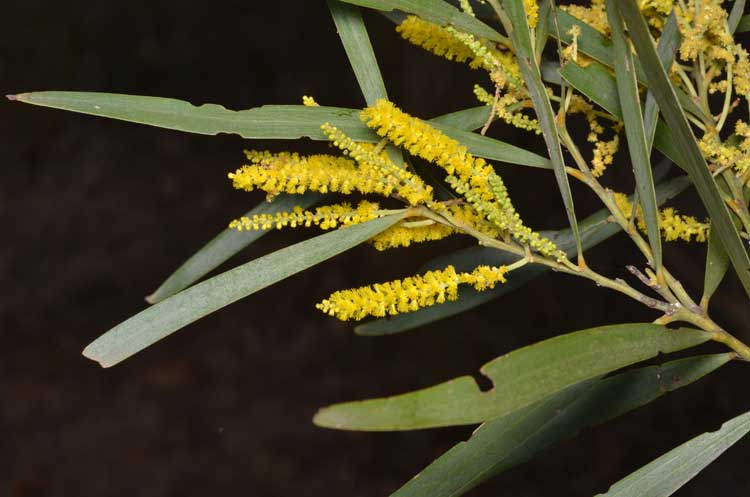

Scientific classification
- Kingdom: Plantae
- Clade: Embryophytes
- Clade: Tracheophytes
- Clade: Angiosperms
- Clade: Eudicots
- Clade: Rosids
- Order: Fabales
- Family: Fabaceae
- Subfamily: Caesalpinioideae
- Clade: Mimosoid clade
- Genus: Acacia
- Species: A. sparsiflora

Binomial name
- Acacia sparsiflora Maiden
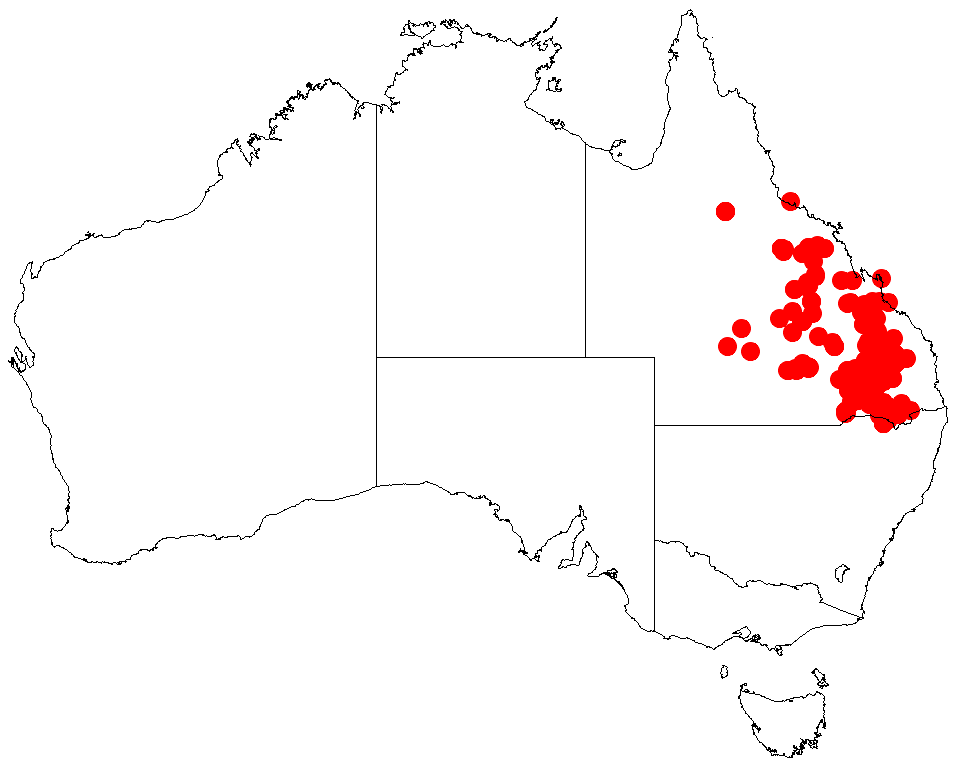
- Occurrence data from AVH

= Acacia sparsiflora =

Currawong

Species of tree

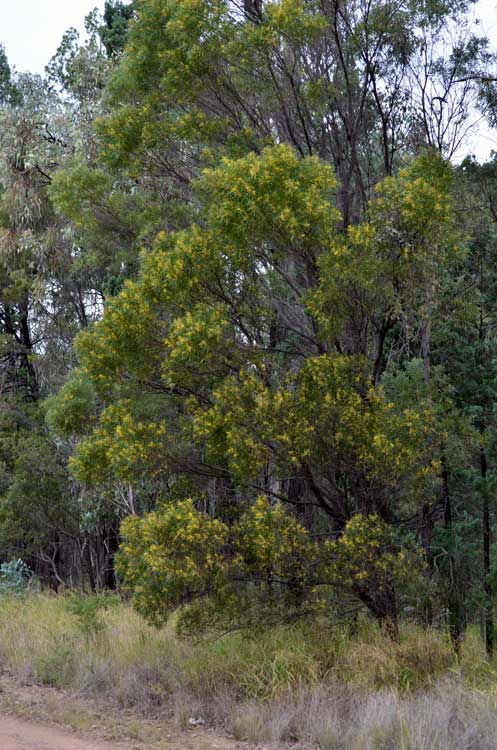
Habit, between Taroom and Miles

Acacia sparsiflora, also known as currawong or currawang, is a tree belonging to the genus Acacia and the subgenus Juliflorae that is native to a large area in eastern Australia.

== Description ==
The tree typically grows to a maximum height of 5 to 15 m (16 to 49 ft). It has brown to grey and sometimes reddish coloured bark that has a rough texture and is hard and corrugated or fissured. The glabrous branchlets are angled at the extremities. Like most species of Acacia it has phyllodes rather than true leaves. The grey-green glabrous phyllodes are sickle shaped and narrowed at both ends. They are thinly coriaceous and have a length of 8 to 16 cm (3.1 to 6.3 in) and a width of 5 to 10 mm (0.20 to 0.39 in) with many fine and close non-anastomosing nerves with one to three that are more prominent. It flowers between May and August producing inflorescences that occur in pairs with cylindrical flower-spikes that have a length of 2 to 4.5 cm (0.79 to 1.77 in) containing bright lemon coloured yellow. The seed pods that form after flowering are brown with yellow margins and are shallowly constricted between the seeds. The thinly coriaceous and glabrous pods have a length of up to 9 cm (3.5 in) and a width of around 3 mm (0.12 in)to 9 cm long. the seeds inside are arranged longitudinally. The shiny blackish to dark-brown seeds have an oblong shape and are 4 to 5 mm (0.16 to 0.20 in) in length with an aril that is folded below the seed.

== Distribution ==
It is endemic to parts of Queensland and New South Wales and is fairly widespread throughout the Darling Downs region. The northern end of its range is to about 120 km (75 mi) to the south of Charters Towers it is found as far as Adavale to the west and down to around Yetman in the south. The tree will often forms dense stands and is sometimes associated with Acacia shirleyi and also as a part of open forests and Eucalyptus woodlands growing in shallow stony soils usually over a bed of weathered sandstone.

== See also ==
- List of Acacia species
