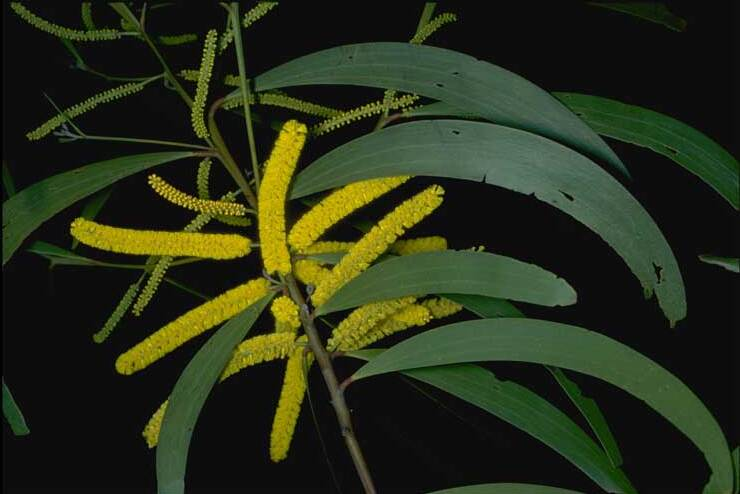
- In the Mount Annan Botanic Garden

Scientific classification
- Kingdom: Plantae
- Clade: Tracheophytes
- Clade: Angiosperms
- Clade: Eudicots
- Clade: Rosids
- Order: Fabales
- Family: Fabaceae
- Subfamily: Caesalpinioideae
- Clade: Mimosoid clade
- Genus: Acacia
- Species: A. blakei

Binomial name
- Acacia blakei Pedley
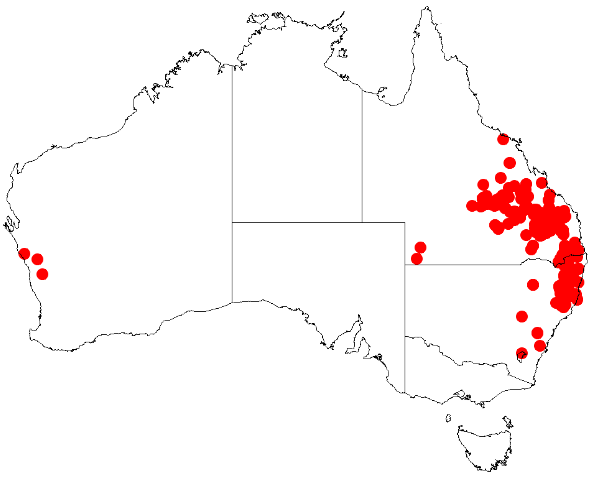
- Acacia blakei occurrence data from Australasian Virtual Herbarium

Synonyms
- Racosperma blakei (Pedley) Pedley subsp. blakei; Acacia cheelii auct. non Blakely: White, C.T. (1939)

= Acacia blakei =

Blake's wattle

Species of shrub

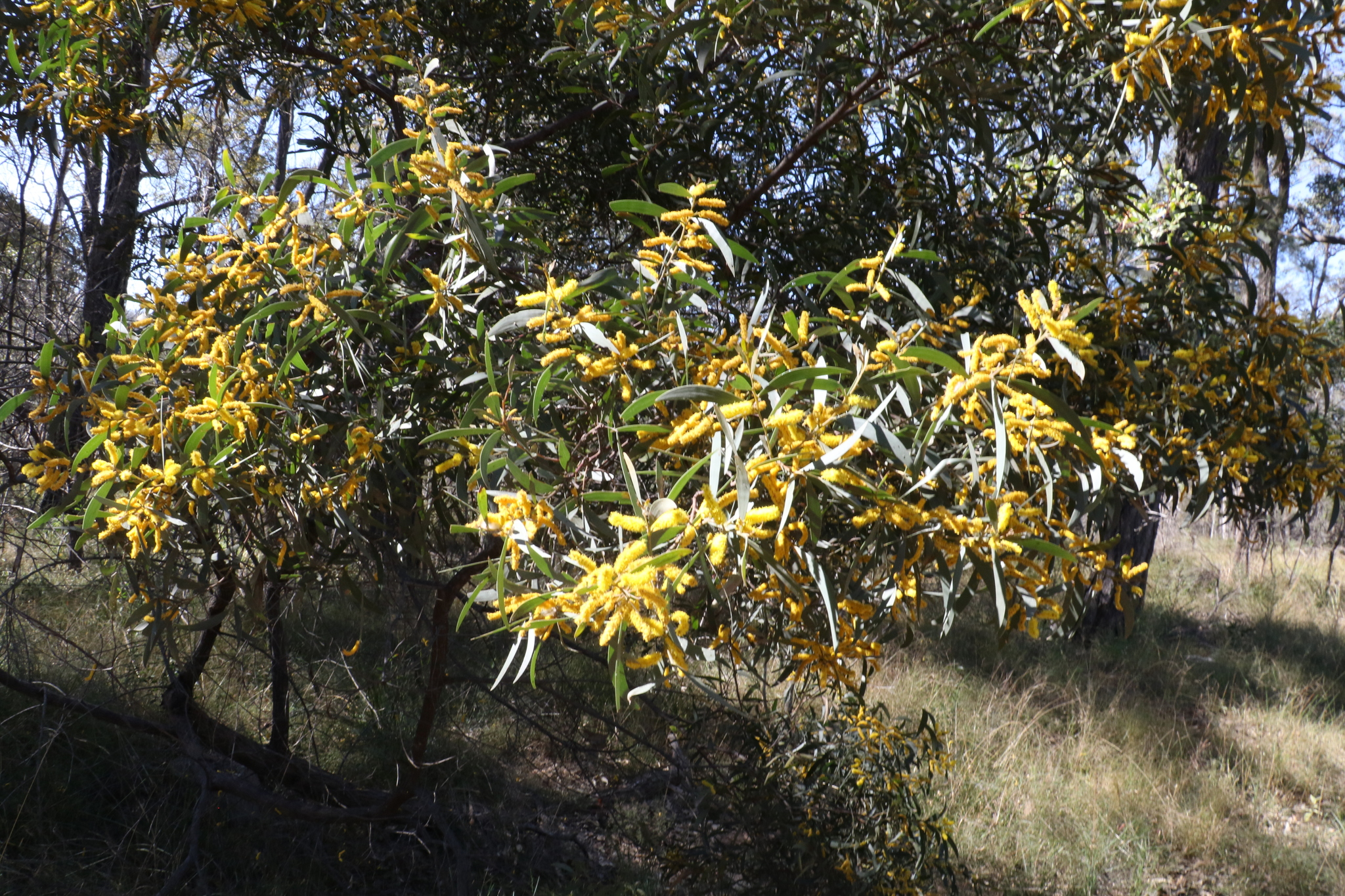
Subspecies diphylla in Fordsdale

Acacia blakei, commonly known as Blake's wattle or Wollomombi wattle, is a species of flowering plant in the family Fabaceae and is endemic to eastern Australia. It is an erect or spreading tree or shrub, with straight or curved phyllodes, yellow, pale yellow or cream-coloured flowers arranged in cylindrical heads in up to three axils, and straight to curved, firmly papery to thinly leathery pods.

== Description ==
Acacia blakei is an erect or spreading tree or shrub that typically grows to a height of less than 15 m (49 ft) and has fissured grey coloured bark. It has light green to brown branchlets, sometimes covered with a white, powdery bloom or with fine scales. Its phyllodes are straight to curved, thinly leathery, mostly glabrous, 40–170 mm (1.6–6.7 in) long and, 7–20 mm (0.28–0.79 in) wide with many closely spaced veins and a small gland near the base. The flowers are yellow to pale yellow or cream-coloured, arranged in racemes in up to twelve cylindrical spikes 20–60 mm (0.79–2.36 in) long in axils on a peduncles 1–5 mm (0.039–0.197 in) long, the flowers. Flowering occurs between August and November and the seed pods are straight to curved, glabrous to sparsely hairy, 30–100 mm (1.2–3.9 in) long and 2–4 mm (0.079–0.157 in) wide and firmly papery to thinly leathery and smooth. The seeds are broadly elliptic, black, 3.5–5.2 mm (0.14–0.20 in) long.

== Taxonomy ==
Acacia blakei was first formally described in 1974 by Leslie Pedley in Contributions from the Queensland Herbarium. The specific epithet (blakei) honours Stanley Thatcher Blake.

In 1975, Mary Tindale described Acacia diphylla in the journal Telopea, but in 1990, Pedley reduced the species to a subspecies of Acacia blakei, and the new name, and the name of the autonym are accepted by the Australian Plant Census:

- Acacia blakei Pedley subsp. blakei (the autonym), commonly known as Blake's wattle, has immature phyllodes often narrowly elliptic to very narrowly elliptic and up to 22 mm (0.87 in) wide.
- Acacia blakei subsp. diphylla (Tindale) Pedley commonly known as Wollomombi wattle, has mostly elliptic phyllodes up to 40 mm (1.6 in) wide.

== Distribution ==
Blake's wattle (subsp. blakei) grows in sandy soils in forest between Tia Falls in New South Wales and the Drummond Range in Central Queensland.

Wollomombi wattle (subsp. diphylla) grows in soil derived from shale or slate in woodland on hillsides and near gorges, near Wollomombi Falls, Hillgrove and Gloucester and further south to the Coxs River and Lake Yarrunga in New South Wales. It also occurs near Ipswich in south-east Queensland.

== See also ==
- List of Acacia species
