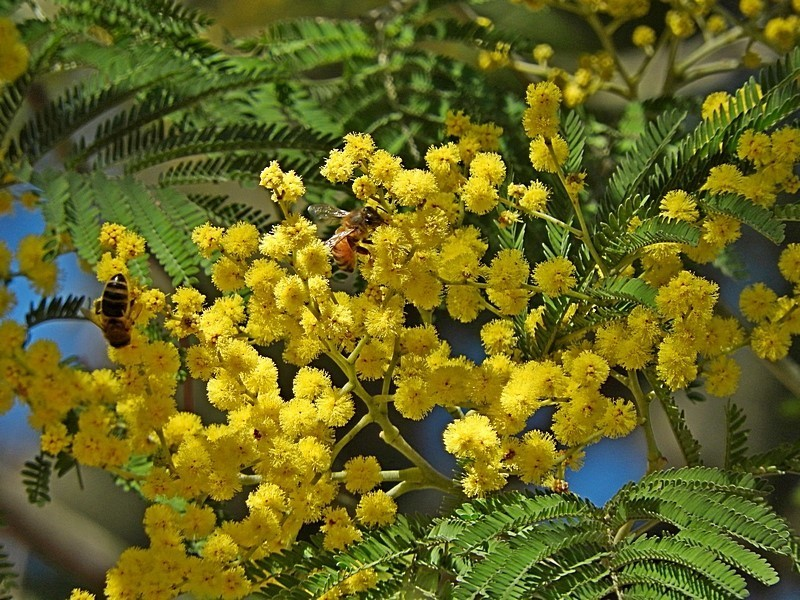
- In the Australian National Botanic Gardens

Scientific classification
- Kingdom: Plantae
- Clade: Embryophytes
- Clade: Tracheophytes
- Clade: Spermatophytes
- Clade: Angiosperms
- Clade: Eudicots
- Clade: Rosids
- Order: Fabales
- Family: Fabaceae
- Subfamily: Caesalpinioideae
- Clade: Mimosoid clade
- Genus: Acacia
- Species: A. silvestris

Binomial name
- Acacia silvestris Tindale
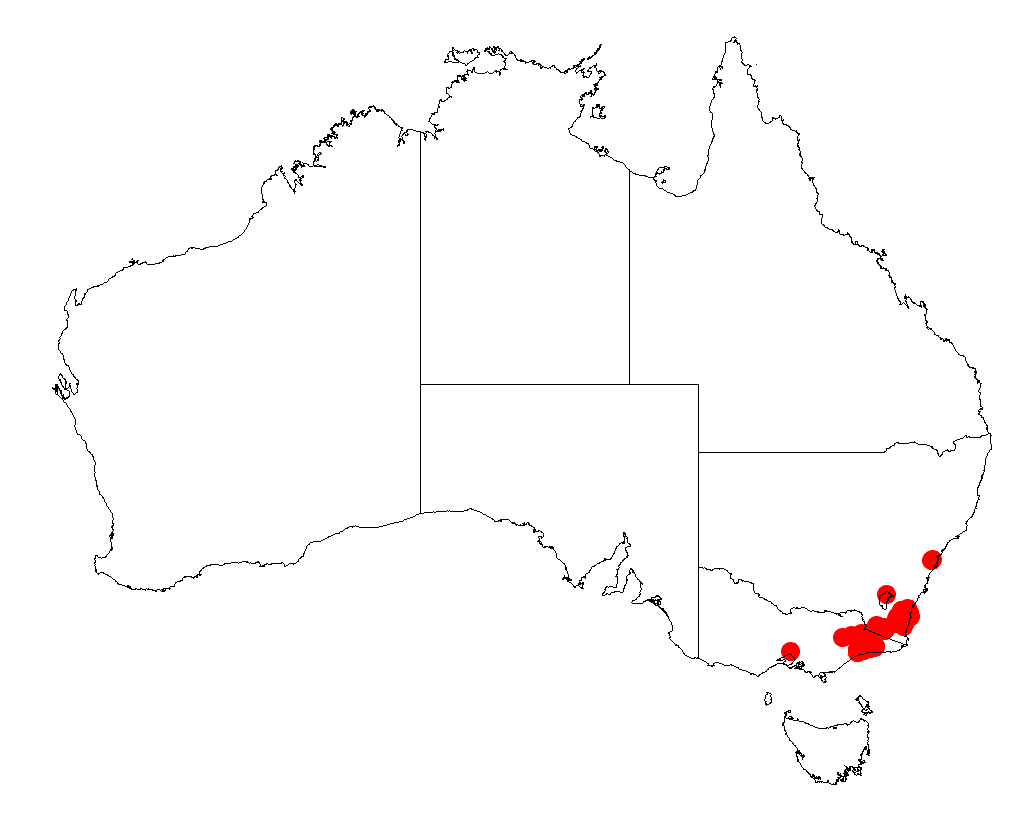
- Occurrence data from AVH

= Acacia silvestris =

Species of plant

Acacia silvestris, commonly known the Bodalla silver wattle, is a tree of the genus Acacia and the subgenus Botrycephalae. It is native to an area in southeastern New South Wales and coastal Victoria.

== Description ==
The erect to spreading tree typically grows to a height of 6 to 30 metres (20 to 98 ft) and a diameter at breast height up to 1.8 m (5 ft 11 in). It has smooth grey bark that can have a mottled appearance. The terete branchlets are scarcely ridged and densely covered with white to grey hairs. The green leaves turn to a silvery colour as they dry. The leaves have rachis that are 6 to 14 cm (2.4 to 5.5 in) in length and contain 5 to 18 pairs of pinnae that are composed of 17 to 50 pairs of pinnules that have narrowly lanceolate shape and a length of 3 to 10.5 mm (0.12 to 0.41 in) and width of 0.7 to 1.5 mm (0.028 to 0.059 in). It flowers from July to September producing yellow inflorescences in axillary or terminal panicles.

== Distribution ==
A. silvestris is endemic to south-eastern Australia from around Bodalla State Forest in New South Wales in the north down to around the highlands in East Gippsland in Victoria where it is often situated on rocky hillsides alongside steep gullies, on alluvial flats and on the saddle of ridges where it grows in a range of soils over slate where it is usually part of open Eucalyptus forest communities and can form extensive forests.

== See also ==
- List of Acacia species
