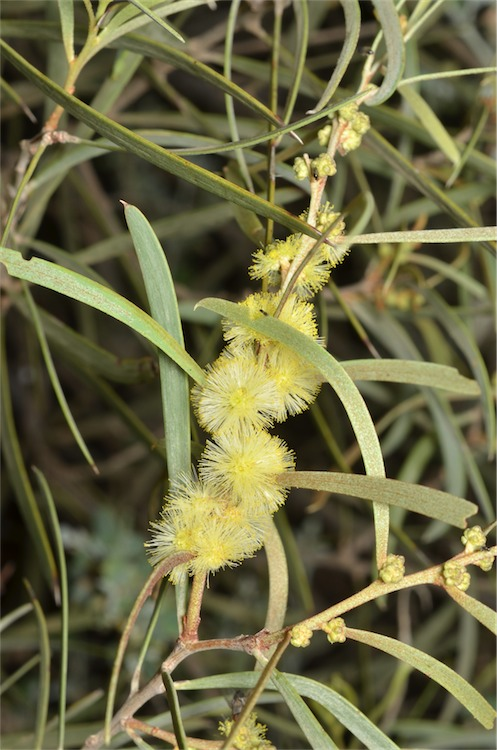
- Inland eastern South Australia

Conservation status
- Least Concern (IUCN 3.1)

Scientific classification
- Kingdom: Plantae
- Clade: Tracheophytes
- Clade: Angiosperms
- Clade: Eudicots
- Clade: Rosids
- Order: Fabales
- Family: Fabaceae
- Subfamily: Caesalpinioideae
- Clade: Mimosoid clade
- Genus: Acacia
- Species: A. oswaldii

Binomial name
- Acacia oswaldii F.Muell.
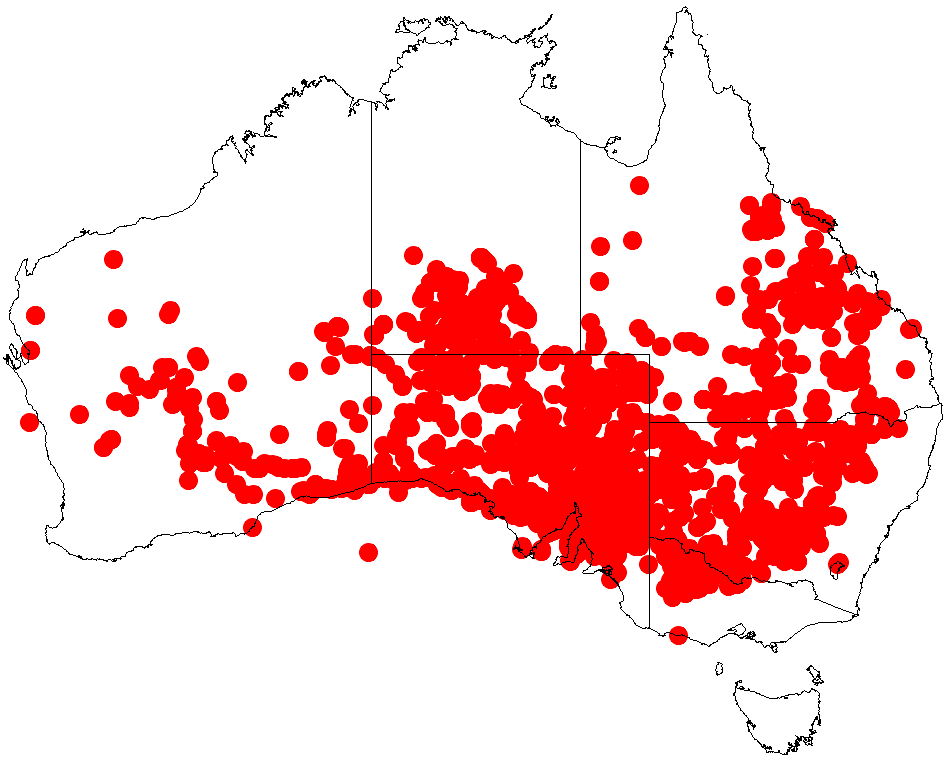
- Occurrence data from AVH

Synonyms
- List: Acacia amaliae Domin; Acacia amaliae Domin var. amaliae; Acacia amaliae var. orthophylla Domin; Acacia osswaldi F.Muell. orth. var.; Acacia oswaldi F.Muell. orth. var.; ? Acacia oswaldi var. abbreviata Benth. orth. var.; Acacia oswaldii F.Muell. nom. inval., pro syn.; Acacia oswaldii F.Muell. nom. inval.; ? Acacia oswaldii var. abbreviata Benth.; Acacia oswaldii F.Muell. var. oswaldii; Acacia sessiliceps F.Muell.; Acacia sp. Mouroubra (D.A.Blood 3342) WA Herbarium; Racosperma oswaldii (F.Muell.) Pedley

= Acacia oswaldii =

Boree

Species of plant

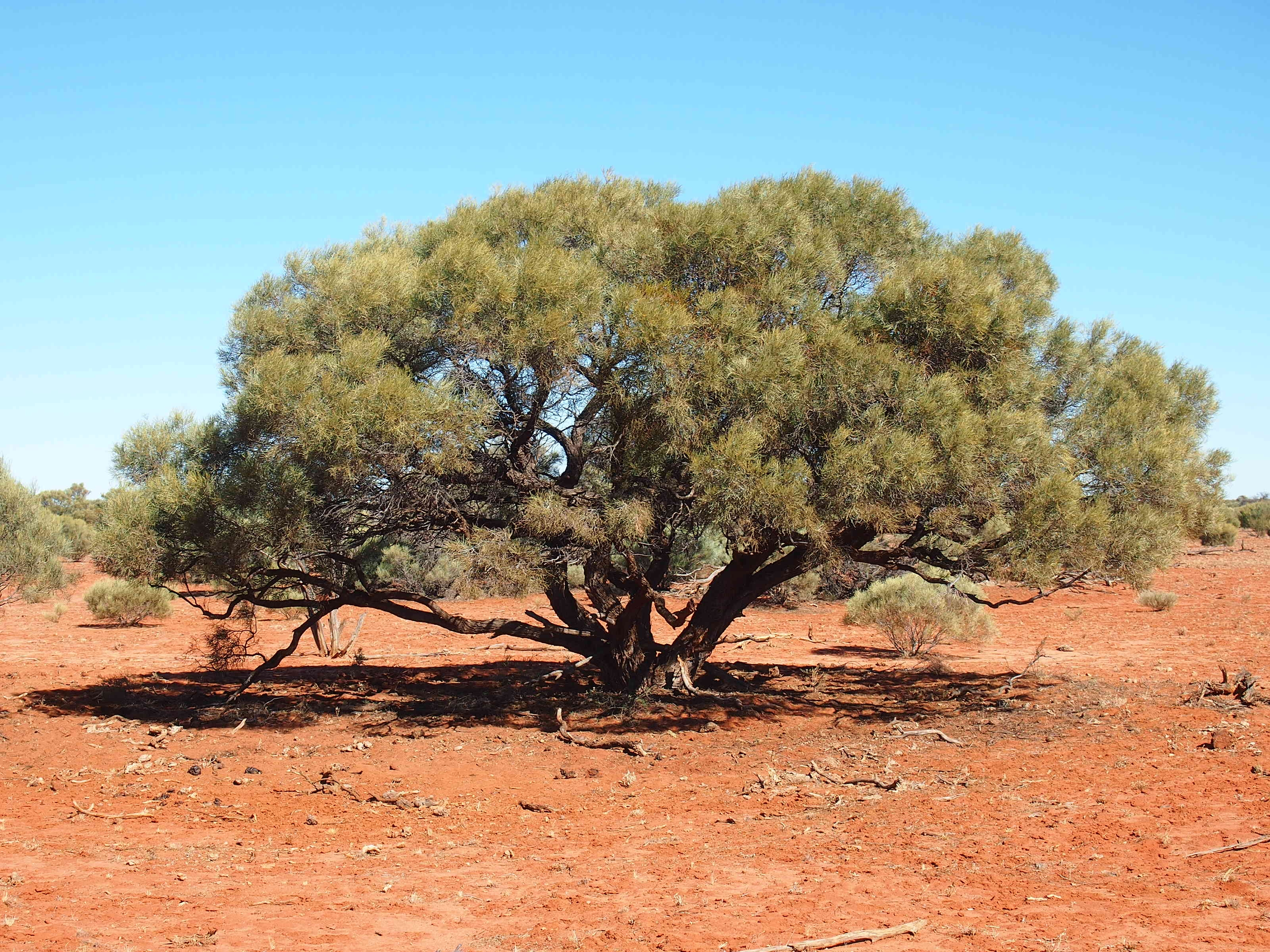
Habit near Ghan

Acacia oswaldii, commonly known as umbrella wattle, umbrella bush, miljee, nelia, middia, curly yarran, whyacka, ram's horn wattle and many others, is a species of flowering plant in the family Fabaceae, and is widespread and scattered in arid, semi-arid and subtropical areas of all mainland states of Australia. It is a shrub or tree with terete, branchlets, spreading to erect linear, narrowly elliptic or narrowly oblong phyllodes, heads of pale yellow flowers and linear, coiled to twisted, leathery to woody, hairy pods.

== Description ==
Acacia oswaldii is shrub or tree that typically grows to a height of 2–8 m (6 ft 7 in – 26 ft 3 in) and has terete branchlets sometimes covered with many tiny red hairs. Its phyllodes are spreading to erect, linear, narrowly elliptic or narrowly oblong, 25–105 mm (0.98–4.13 in) long and 3–15 mm (0.12–0.59 in) wide, glabrous, sometimes with a sharp point on the end, leathery to rigid, with three to six raised main veins. The flowers are borne in two flattened, spherical heads in axils on peduncles up to 0.8 mm (0.031 in) long, each head 4.5–5.0 mm (0.18–0.20 in) long with 4 to 15 pale yellow flowers. Flowering occurs from October to December and the pods are linear, coiled to twisted, up to 310 mm (12 in) long, 6–12 mm (0.24–0.47 in) wide, leathery to woody and covered with many clumps of minute red hairs when young. The seeds are oblong, 6–8 mm (0.24–0.31 in) long, glossy dark brown with a broad, fleshy, yellow-orange aril.

== Taxonomy ==
Acacia oswaldii was first formally described in 1863 by Ferdinand von Mueller in hias Fragmenta Phytographiae Australiae. The specific epithet (oswaldii) honours Ferdinand Carl Osswald, a pharmacist in Adelaide, who collected for Mueller.

== Distribution and habitat ==
Umbrella wattle is widespread and scattered in arid, semi-arid and subtropical areas in all mainland states and the Northern Territory, south of 19°S, where it grows mainly in calcareous and sandy soils.

== See also ==
- List of Acacia species
