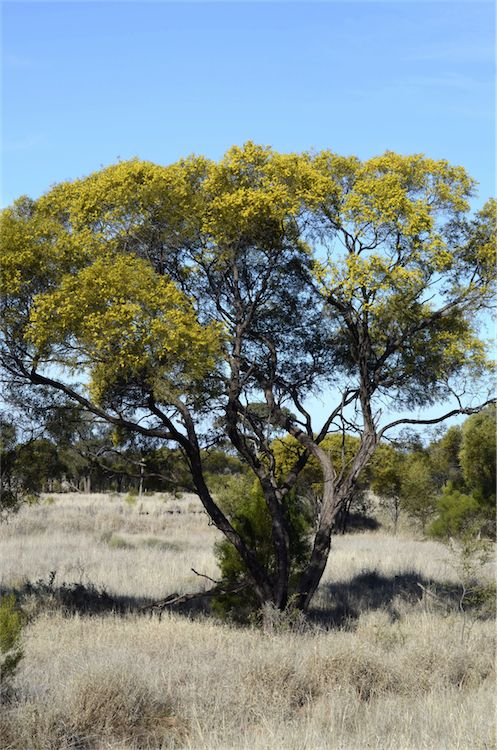
- Specimen growing near Nyngan

Conservation status
- Least Concern (IUCN 3.1)

Scientific classification
- Kingdom: Plantae
- Clade: Tracheophytes
- Clade: Angiosperms
- Clade: Eudicots
- Clade: Rosids
- Order: Fabales
- Family: Fabaceae
- Subfamily: Caesalpinioideae
- Clade: Mimosoid clade
- Genus: Acacia
- Species: A. omalophylla

Binomial name
- Acacia omalophylla A.Cunn. ex Benth.
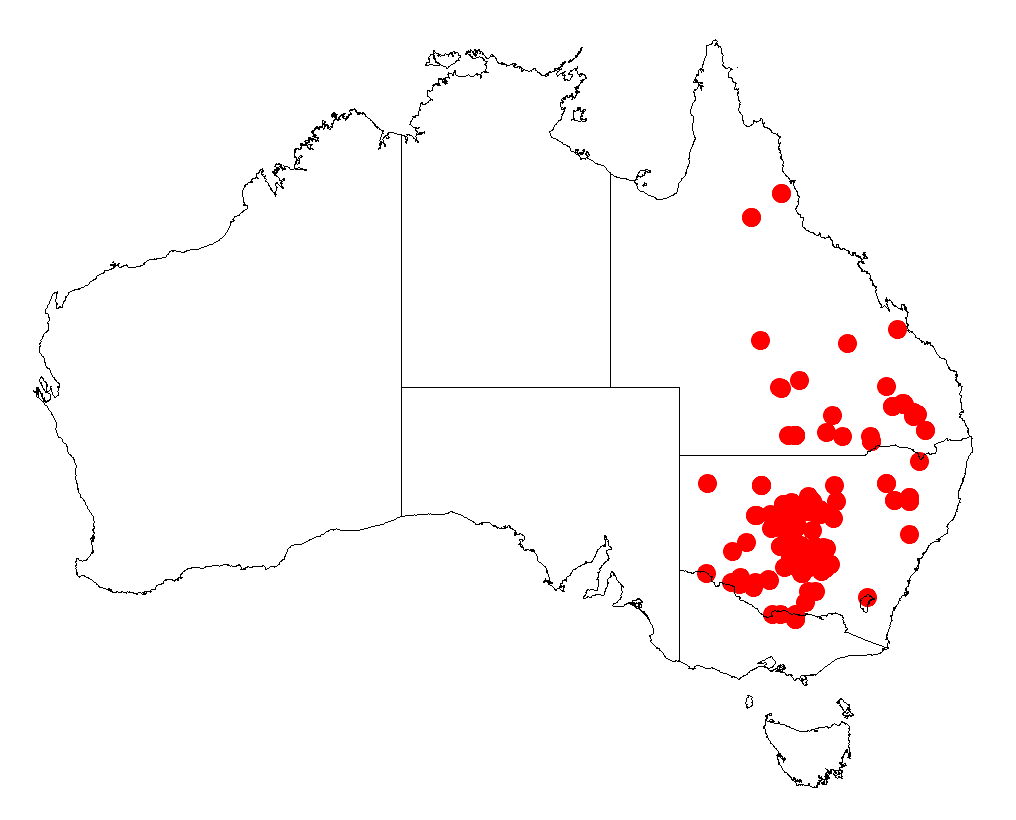
- Occurrence data from AVH

Synonyms
- Racosperma omalophyllum (A.Cunn. ex Benth.) Pedley; Acacia homalophylla A.Cunn. ex Benth. orth. var.

= Acacia omalophylla =

Yarran

Species of legume

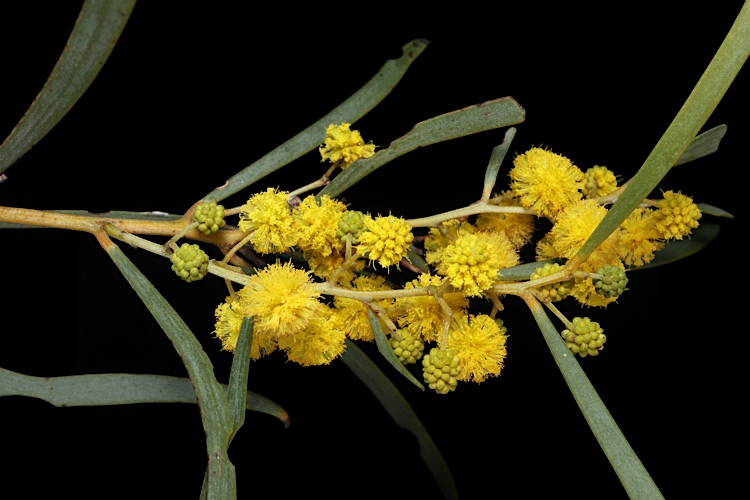
Flowers, near Balranald

Acacia omalophylla, known as Acacia homalophylla by Australian authorities and commonly known as yarrany or yarran, or gidgee, is a species of flowering plant in the family Fabaceae, and is endemic to eastern mainland Australia. It is an erect or spreading tree or shrub with angular branchlets at the end, narrowly elliptic, leathery phyllodes, spherical heads of golden yellow flowers and linear, papery to leathery pods.

== Description ==
Acacia homalophylla is an erect or spreading tree or shrub, that typically grows to a height of 5–10 m (16–33 ft) and has branchlets that are angular near the ends. Its phyllodes are narrowly elliptic, straight or slightly curved, 40–110 mm (1.6–4.3 in) long, 4–7 mm (0.16–0.28 in) wide and leathery with many closely parallel, obscure veins. The flower are borne in two or three spherical heads on hairy peduncles 2–5 mm (0.079–0.197 in) long, each head 4–5 mm (0.16–0.20 in) in diameter with 20 to 30 golden yellow flowers. Flowering mainly occurs from July to October, and the pods are linear, straight to slightly curved, up to 90 mm (3.5 in) long, 3–5 mm (0.12–0.20 in) wide, papery or leathery, more or less glabrous with thickened margins and slightly raised and irregularly constricted between the seeds. The seeds are broadly elliptic, 3–5 mm (0.12–0.20 in) long, and dark brown with a small aril on the end.

== Taxonomy ==
Acacia homalophylla was first formally described in 1842 by George Bentham in Hooker's London Journal of Botany from an unpublished description of Allan Cunningham of a plants he collected near the Lachlan River. Bentham gave the name Acacia omalophylla in his original publication, but later changed the spelling to Acacia homalophylla in Flora Australiensis. The specific epithet (homalophylla) "probably refers to the smoothness of the phyllodes which are flat and often appearing more or less veinless".

== Distribution and habitat ==
Yarrany usually grows in belah (Casuarina cristata) communities in brown soils with calcareous nodules, and in bimble box (Eucalyptus populnea) woodland in several other soil types, and is widespread from central southern Queensland south of Yaraka and Duaringa, in the north and central western slopes and far western plains of central New South Wales, and a short distance across the Murray River into Victoria. It has also been introduced into India and Pakistan.

== Uses ==
This species of wattle yields a gum.

== See also ==
- List of Acacia species
