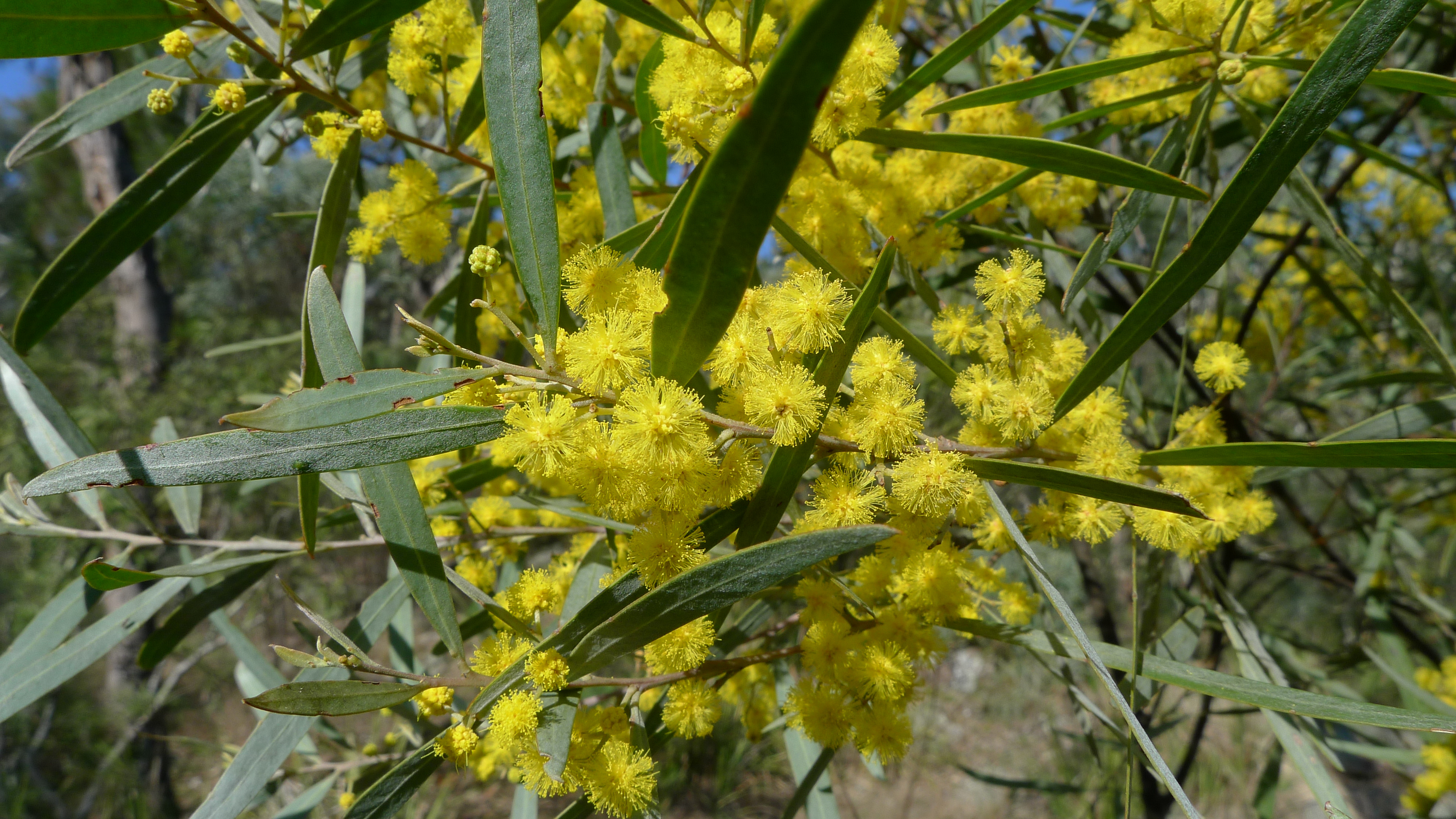

Scientific classification
- Kingdom: Plantae
- Clade: Tracheophytes
- Clade: Angiosperms
- Clade: Eudicots
- Clade: Rosids
- Order: Fabales
- Family: Fabaceae
- Subfamily: Caesalpinioideae
- Clade: Mimosoid clade
- Genus: Acacia
- Species: A. neriifolia

Binomial name
- Acacia neriifolia A.Cunn. ex Benth.
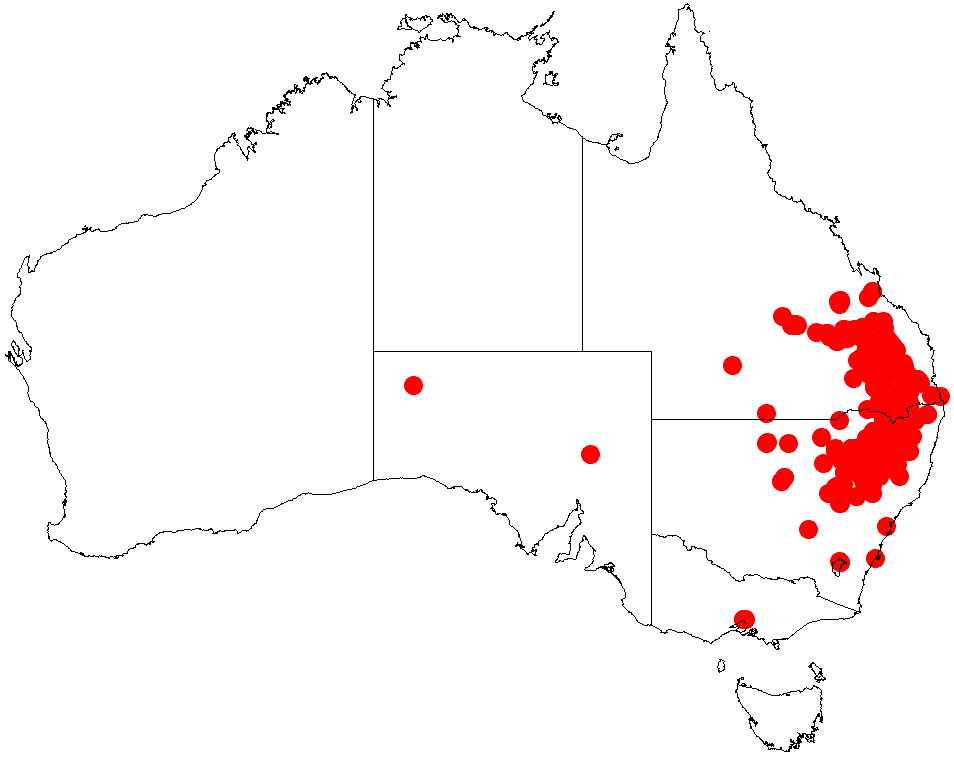
- Occurrence data from AVH

Synonyms
- ? Acacia penninervis var. angustata F.M.Bailey; Racosperma neriifolium (Benth.) Pedley

= Acacia neriifolia =

Oleander wattle

Species of legume

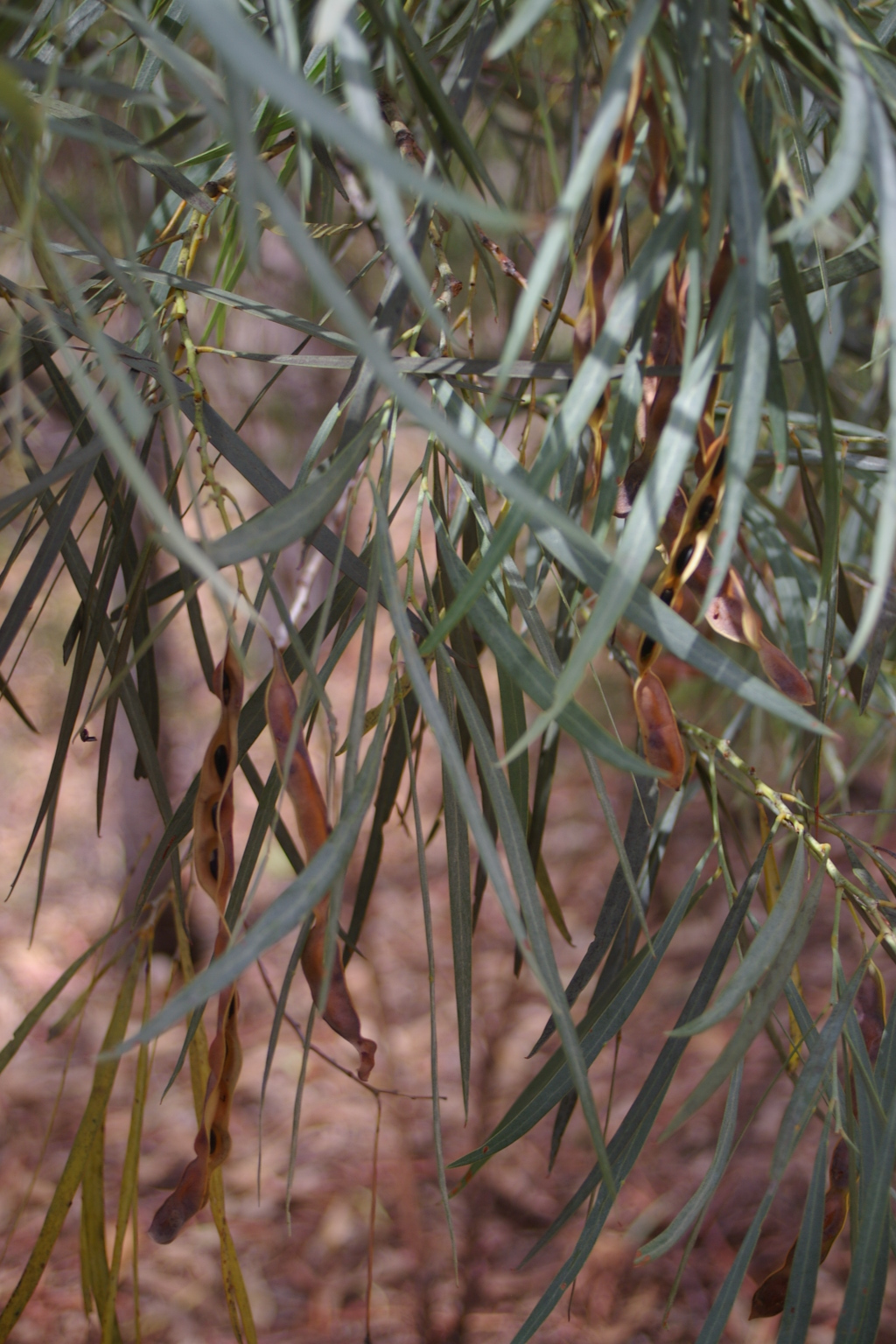
Foliage and pods.

Acacia neriifolia, also known as the oleander wattle, silver wattle, black wattle, pechy wattle or bastard yarran, is a species of flowering plant in the family Fabaceae, and is endemic to eastern Australia. It is an erect shrub or tree with silvery white hairs pressed against the surface of its branchlets, narrowly elliptic to almost linear phyllodes, spherical heads of vivid golden yellow flowers and thinly leathery, glabrous pods.

== Description ==
Acacia neriifolia is an erect tree or shrub that typically grows to a height of up to 9 m (30 ft) and has branchlets covered with silvery white hairs pressed agaist the surface, or sometimes glabrous. Its phyllodes are very narrowly elliptic to almost linear, straight or slightly curved, 50–150 mm (2.0–5.9 in) long, 4–9 mm (0.16–0.35 in) wide, covered with more or less silvery white hairs pressed against the surface. The midvein of the phyllodes is prominent, the lateral veins more or less obscure, there is a small hard point on the tip and up to three more or less prominent glands, the lowermost up to 10 mm (0.39 in) above the pulvinus. The flowers are borne in eight to twenty spherical heads in racemes 30–90 mm (1.2–3.5 in) long in axils on peduncles 3–5 mm (0.12–0.20 in) long. Each head is 3.5–7 mm (0.14–0.28 in) in diameter with 20 to 40 vivid golden yellow flowers. Flowering usually occurs from July to October, and the pods are straight to slightly curved, 60–180 mm (2.4–7.1 in) long, 6–10 mm (0.24–0.39 in) wide and thinly leathery. The seeds are oblong or egg-shaped, 5.5–6.0 mm (0.22–0.24 in) long, more or less dull black with a club-shaped aril.

== Taxonomy ==
Acacia neriifolia was first formally described in 1842 by George Bentham in Hooker's London Journal of Botany from an unpublished description by Allan Cunningham from specimens collected on the Liverpool Plains of New South Wales. The specific epithet (neriifolia) refers to the similarity of the phyllodes to the leaves of Nerium.

== Distribution and habitat ==
Oleander wattle grows in forest and woodland, often on granite outcrops, mainly on the western slopes of the Great Dividing Range between about Emerald in Queensland to about Dubbo and Tamworth in New South Wales.

== Conservation status ==
Acacia neriifolia is listed as of 'least concern' under the Queensland Government Nature Conservation Act 1992.

== See also ==
- List of Acacia species
