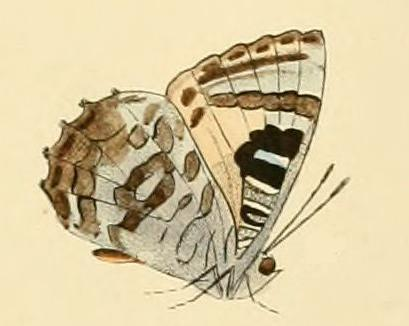

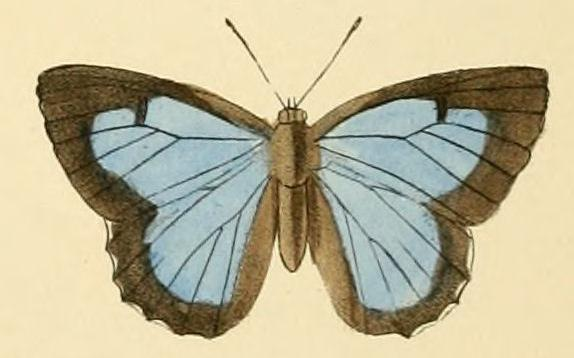

Scientific classification
- Kingdom: Animalia
- Phylum: Arthropoda
- Clade: Pancrustacea
- Class: Insecta
- Order: Lepidoptera
- Family: Lycaenidae
- Genus: Ogyris
- Species: O. oroetes

Binomial name
- Ogyris oroetes Hewitson, 1862

Synonyms
- Ogyris apiculata Quick, 1972

= Ogyris oroetes =

Species of butterfly

Ogyris oroetes, the silky azure, is a butterfly in the family Lycaenidae. It is found in most of mainland Australia.

The wingspan is 30–40 mm.

The larvae feed on Loranthaceae species, including Amyema miquelii, Amyema bifurcata and Amyema pendula.

== Subspecies ==
- Ogyris oroetes oroetes (Queensland to New South Wales and Western Australia)
- Ogyris oroetes apiculata Quick, 1972 (Western Australia)
