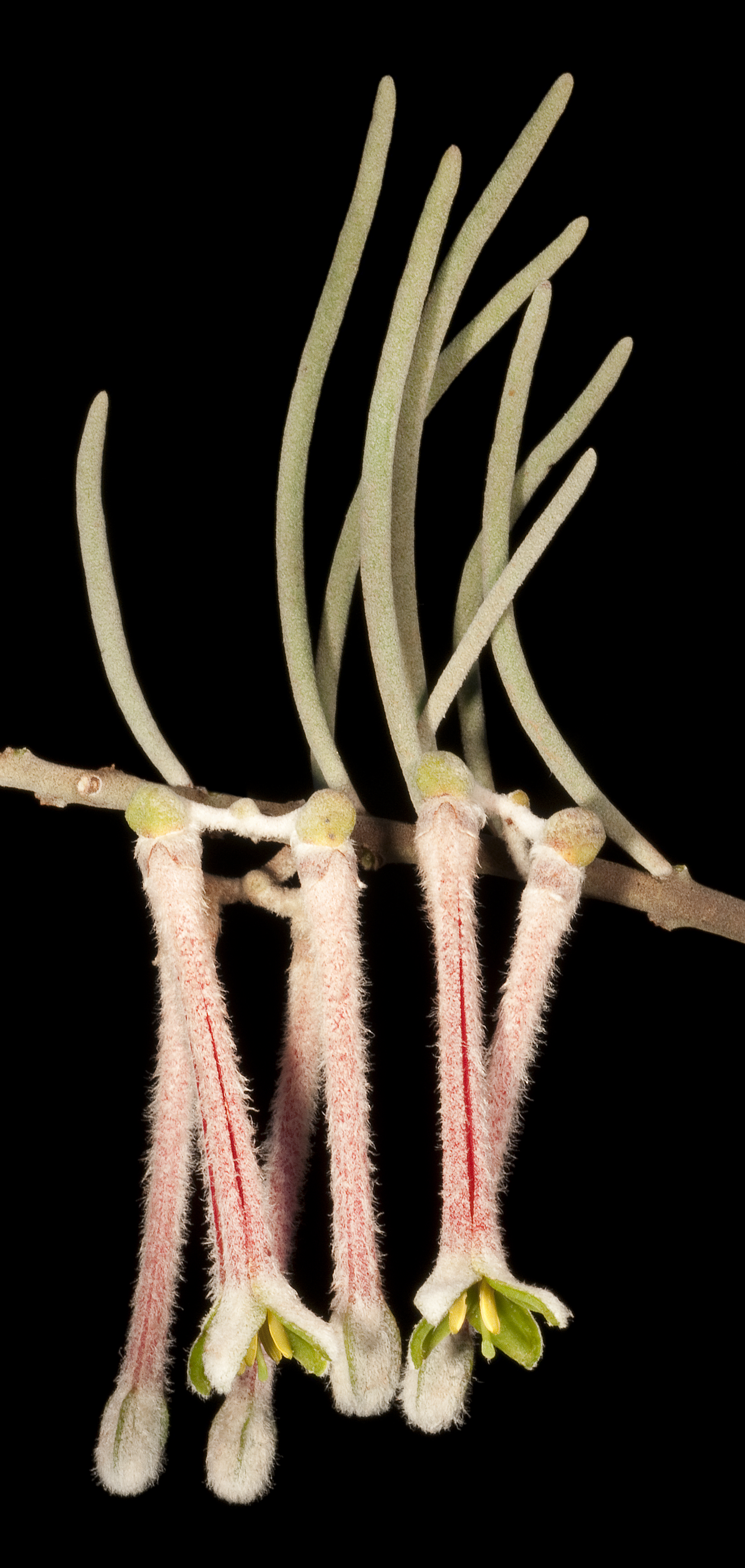
- Amyema gibberula var. gibberula

Scientific classification
- Kingdom: Plantae
- Clade: Tracheophytes
- Clade: Angiosperms
- Clade: Eudicots
- Order: Santalales
- Family: Loranthaceae
- Genus: Amyema
- Species: A. gibberula

Binomial name
- Amyema gibberula (Tate) Danser
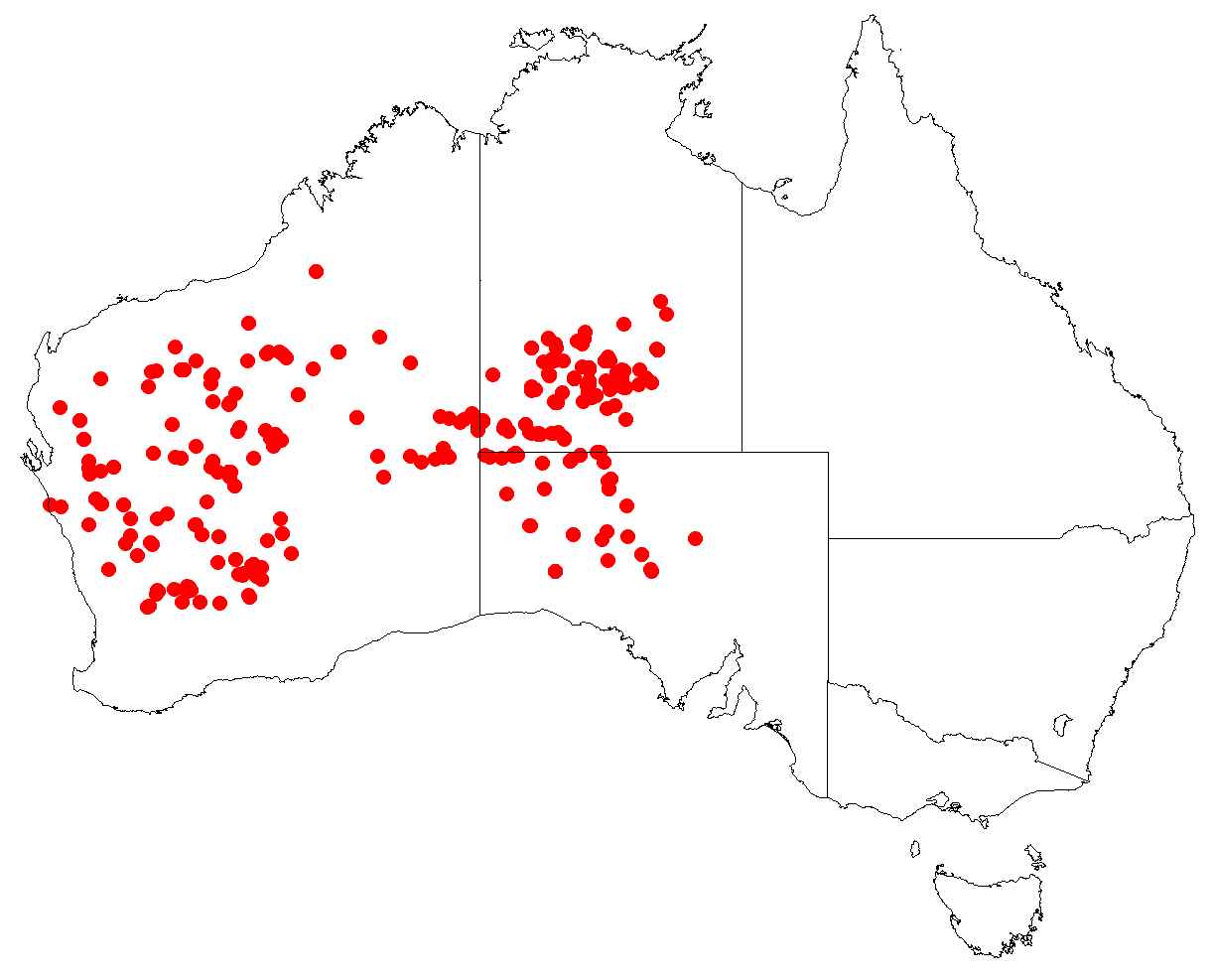
- Collections data for A. gibberula from the Australasian Virtual Herbarium

Synonyms
- Amyema gibberulosa Tiegh. Loranthus gibberulus Tate; Tapinostemma gibberulum (Tate) Tiegh.

= Amyema gibberula =

Species of plant

Amyema gibberula is an aerial hemiparasitic plant of the family Loranthaceae native to Australia and found in Western Australia, the Northern Territory, and South Australia.

== Description ==
It flowers in dyads (groups of two flowers) and usually has four petals. The filaments of the stamens are shorter than the anthers of the stamen. Its green, red, pink and white flowers can be seen from April to September or November to December. The leaves are terete (cylindrical and long).

== Ecology ==
A. gibberula is found on various species of Hakea and Grevillea.

== Taxonomy ==
It was first described by Tate in 1886 as Loranthus gibberulus, with its genus being changed to Amyema by Danser in 1992.
