= Amyema mackayensis =

Scientific classification
- Kingdom: Plantae
- Clade: Embryophytes
- Clade: Tracheophytes
- Clade: Spermatophytes
- Clade: Angiosperms
- Clade: Eudicots
- Order: Santalales
- Family: Loranthaceae
- Genus: Amyema
- Species: A. mackayensis

Binomial name
- Amyema mackayensis (Blakely) Danser
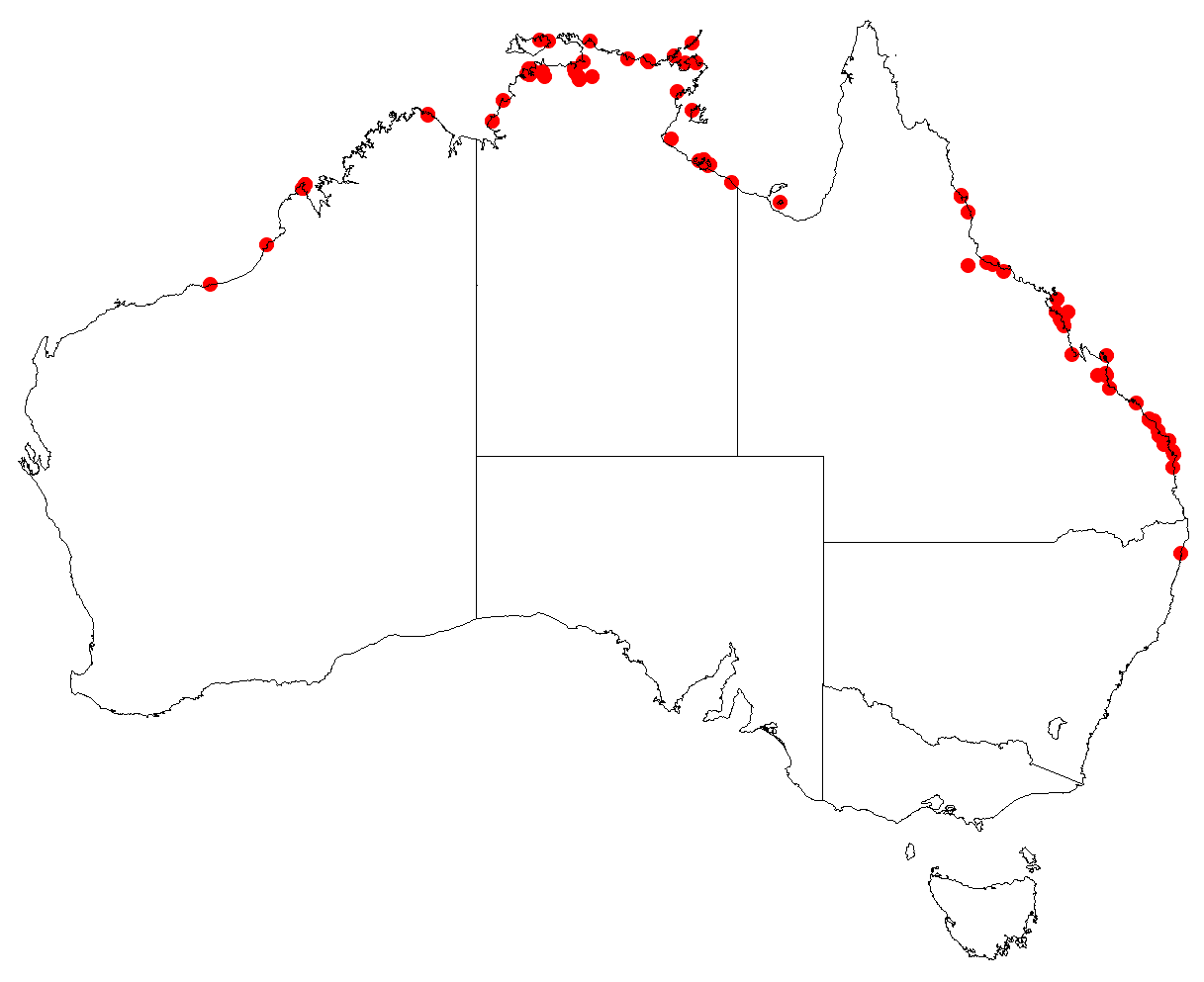
- Collections data for A. mackayensis from the Australasian Virtual Herbarium

Species of epiphyte

Amyema mackayensis, the mangrove mistletoe, is a species of flowering plant within the genus Amyema, an epiphytic hemiparasitic plant of the family Loranthaceae native to Australia, and found along its northern and eastern coasts in New South Wales, Queensland, the Northern Territory and Western Australia, and also in New Guinea.

== Description ==
The opposite flat leaves have a distinct stem and are thick, fleshy and round, and can be up to 6 cm in length. The inflorescence is an umbel of two or more triads or tetrads (flowering in a group of four). The mature buds are terete (long and cylindrical) or angular, and smooth or with just a few scattered hairs.

== Ecology ==
A. mackayensis is found along the coast and in maritime communities, on mangroves, in particular on the grey mangrove (Avicennia marina) Moss & Kendall comment that there is evidence that this mistletoe accumulates excess salt loads in leaves which it sheds, and thus reduce its salt load.

== Taxonomy ==
A. mackayensis was first described by Blakely in 1922 as Loranthus mackayensis, but in 1929 was placed in the genus Amyema by Danser.
