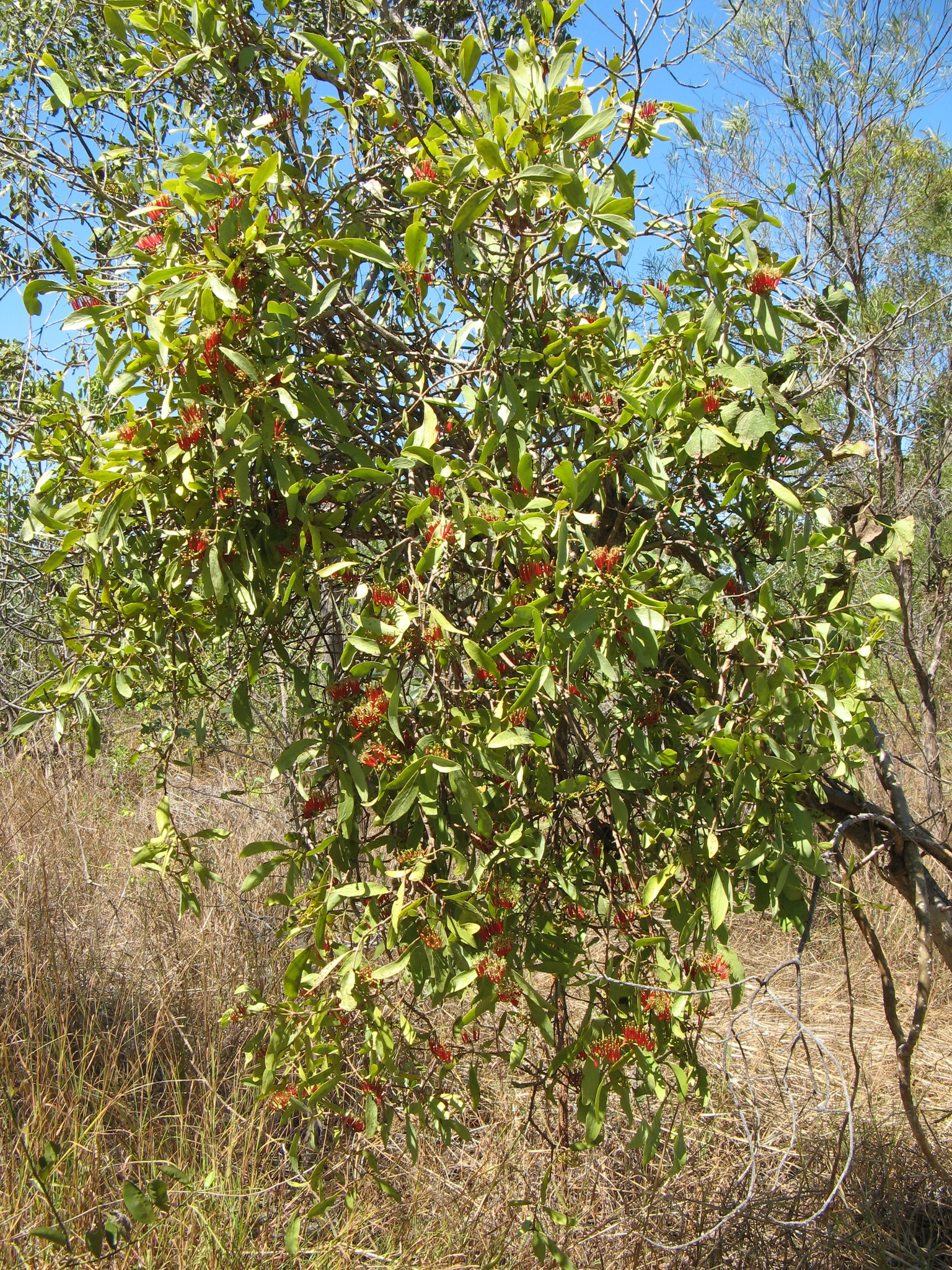

Scientific classification
- Kingdom: Plantae
- Clade: Tracheophytes
- Clade: Angiosperms
- Clade: Eudicots
- Order: Santalales
- Family: Loranthaceae
- Genus: Amyema
- Species: A. dolichopoda

Binomial name
- Amyema dolichopoda Barlow

= Amyema dolichopoda =

Species of epiphyte

Amyema dolichopoda is a species of mistletoe in the family Loranthaceae native to Western Australia.
