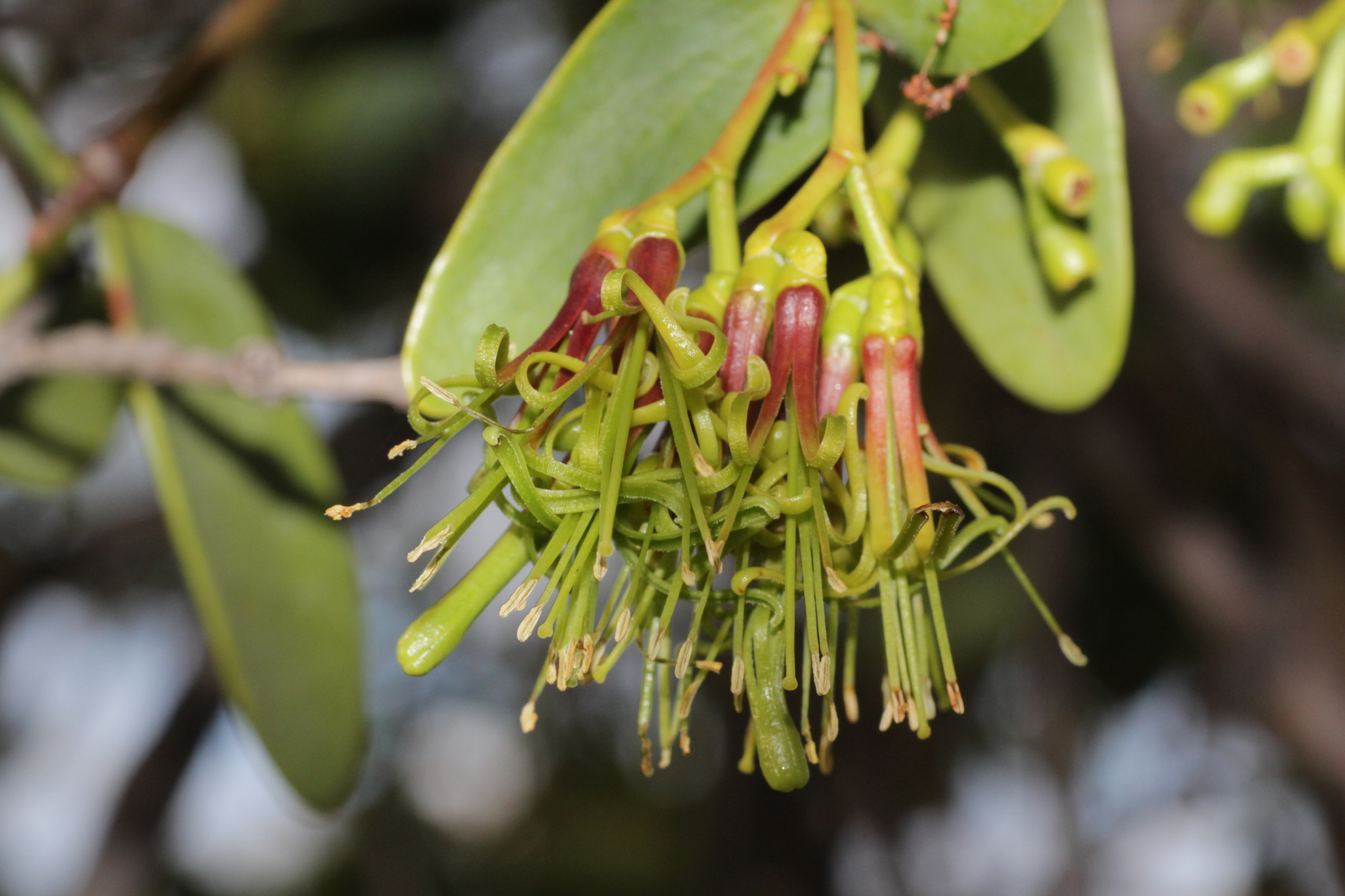

Scientific classification
- Kingdom: Plantae
- Clade: Tracheophytes
- Clade: Angiosperms
- Clade: Eudicots
- Order: Santalales
- Family: Loranthaceae
- Genus: Amyema
- Species: A. benthamii

Binomial name
- Amyema benthamii (Blakely) Danser.
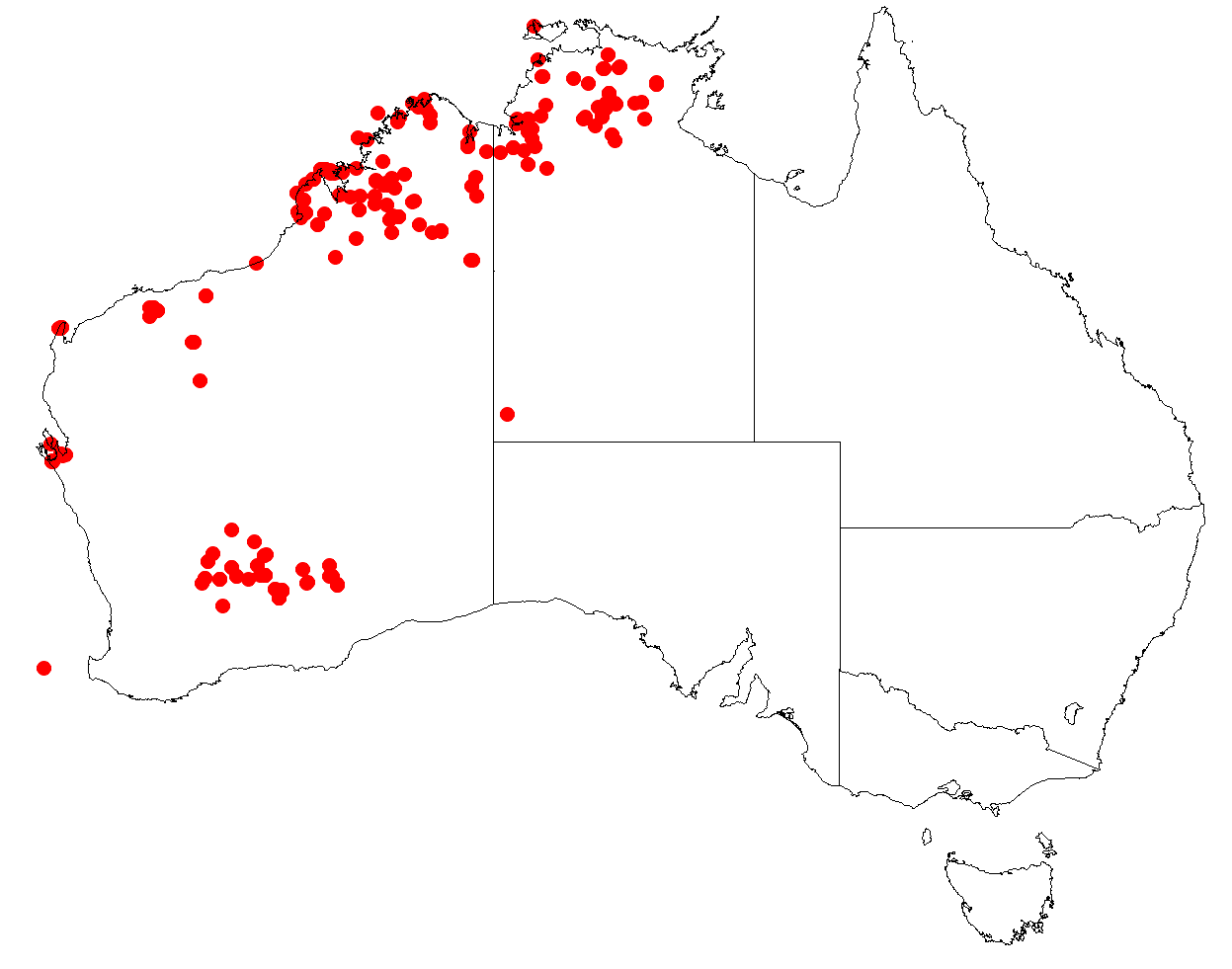
- Collections data for A. benthamii from the Australasian Virtual Herbarium

= Amyema benthamii =

Species of epiphyte

Amyema benthamii, commonly known as the twin-leaved mistletoe or Bentham's mistletoe, is a species of flowering plant, an epiphytic hemiparasitic plant of the family Loranthaceae native to Western Australia and the Northern Territory of Australia in semi-arid woodland. This species is named in honour of the English botanist George Bentham who between 1863 and 1878 published Flora Australiensis, the first flora of Australia.

== Description ==
This mistletoe has slender stems with opposite pairs of sessile (unstalked), semi-clasping, bluish-green leaves about 2 cm (0.8 in) long. The flowers, which have reddish-brown stalks, are borne in the axils of the leaves in dangling groups of three; the buds are reddish-purple with green bases and tips, and open to reveal pale green petals and a projecting boss of stamens. It has a sparse, open habit of growth.

== Taxonomy ==
The species was first described in 1922 as Loranthus benthamii by William Blakely, but was reassigned to the genus, Amyema, by Benedictus Hubertus Danser in 1929.

== Ecology ==
A. benthamii has been recorded as growing on thirty-one different species of host plant from eighteen different plant families. The most frequently used host is the bottletree (Brachychiton spp.), but other common hosts include Owenia and Acacia.
