= Amyema arthrocaulis =

Scientific classification
- Kingdom: Plantae
- Clade: Tracheophytes
- Clade: Angiosperms
- Clade: Eudicots
- Order: Santalales
- Family: Loranthaceae
- Genus: Amyema
- Species: A. arthrocaulis

Binomial name
- Amyema arthrocaulis Barlow

Species of epiphyte

Amyema arthrocaulis is a species of mistletoe in the family Loranthaceae native to New Guinea.
