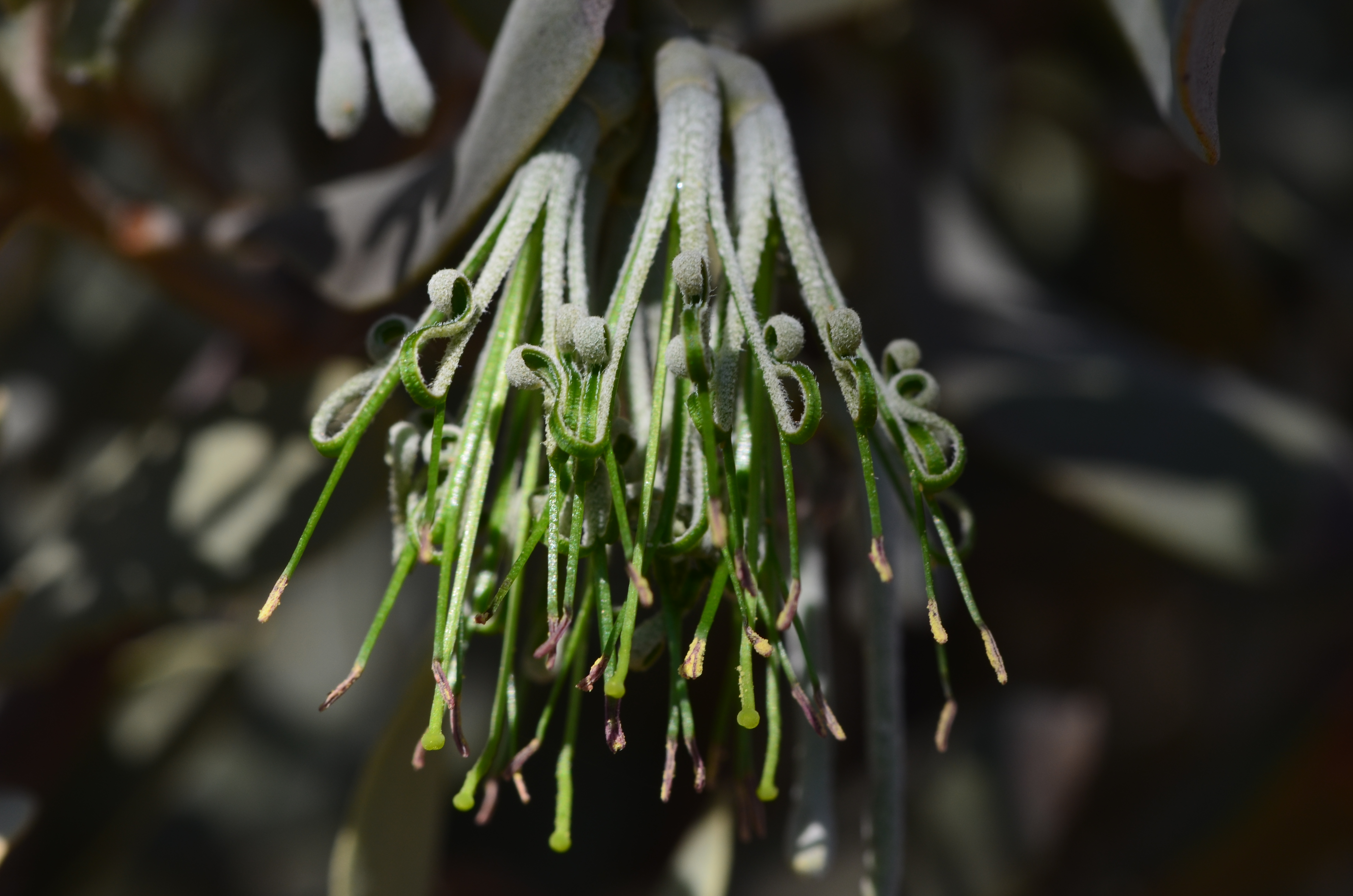
- Amyema maidenii

Scientific classification
- Kingdom: Plantae
- Clade: Tracheophytes
- Clade: Angiosperms
- Clade: Eudicots
- Order: Santalales
- Family: Loranthaceae
- Genus: Amyema
- Species: A. maidenii

Binomial name
- Amyema maidenii (Blakely) Barlow
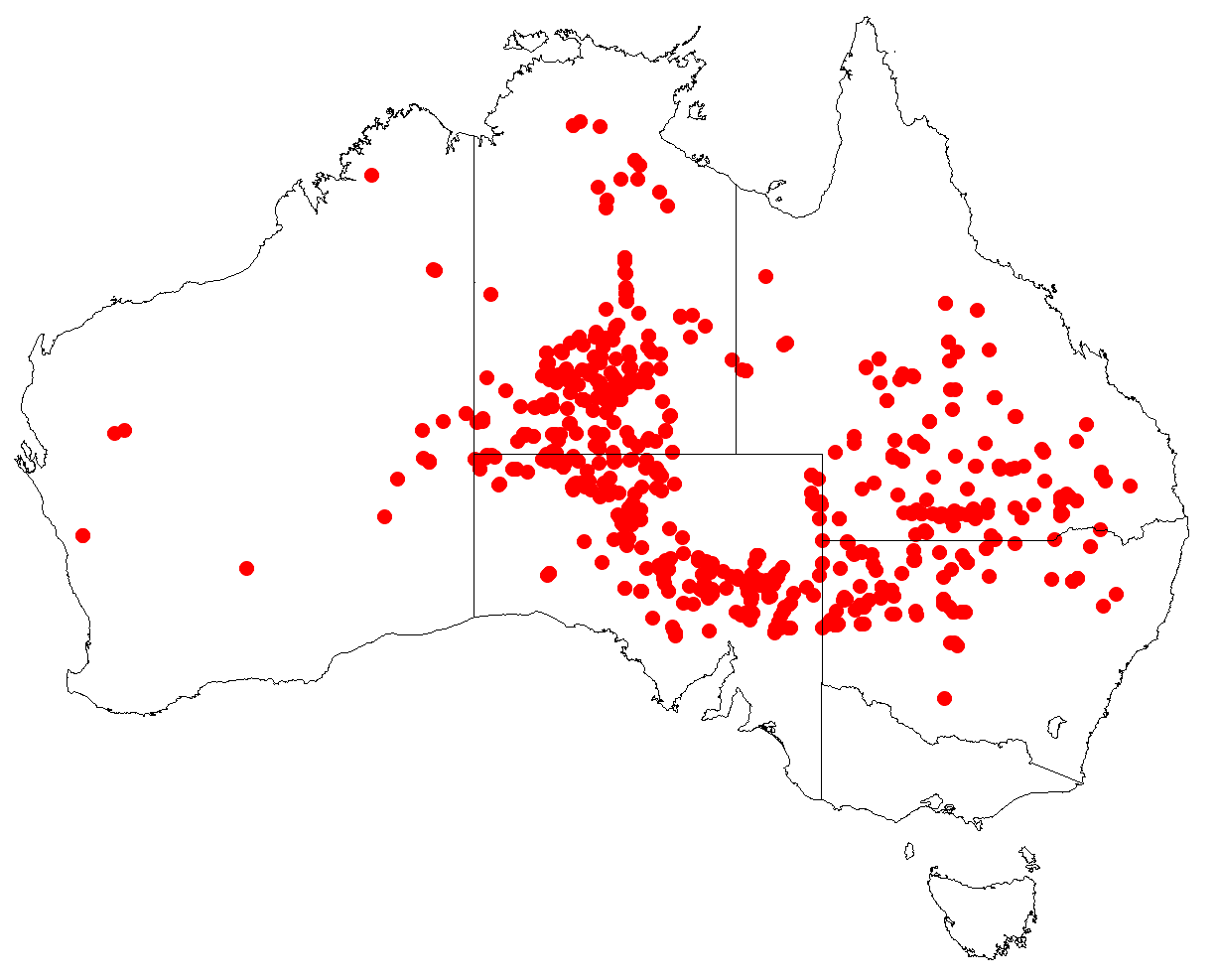
- Collections data for A. maidenii from the Australasian Virtual Herbarium

= Amyema maidenii =

Species of plant

Amyema maidenii is a species of flowering plant within the genus Amyema, an epiphytic hemiparasitic plant of the family Loranthaceae native to Australia and found Australia-wide in the inland (but not in Victoria nor Tasmania).

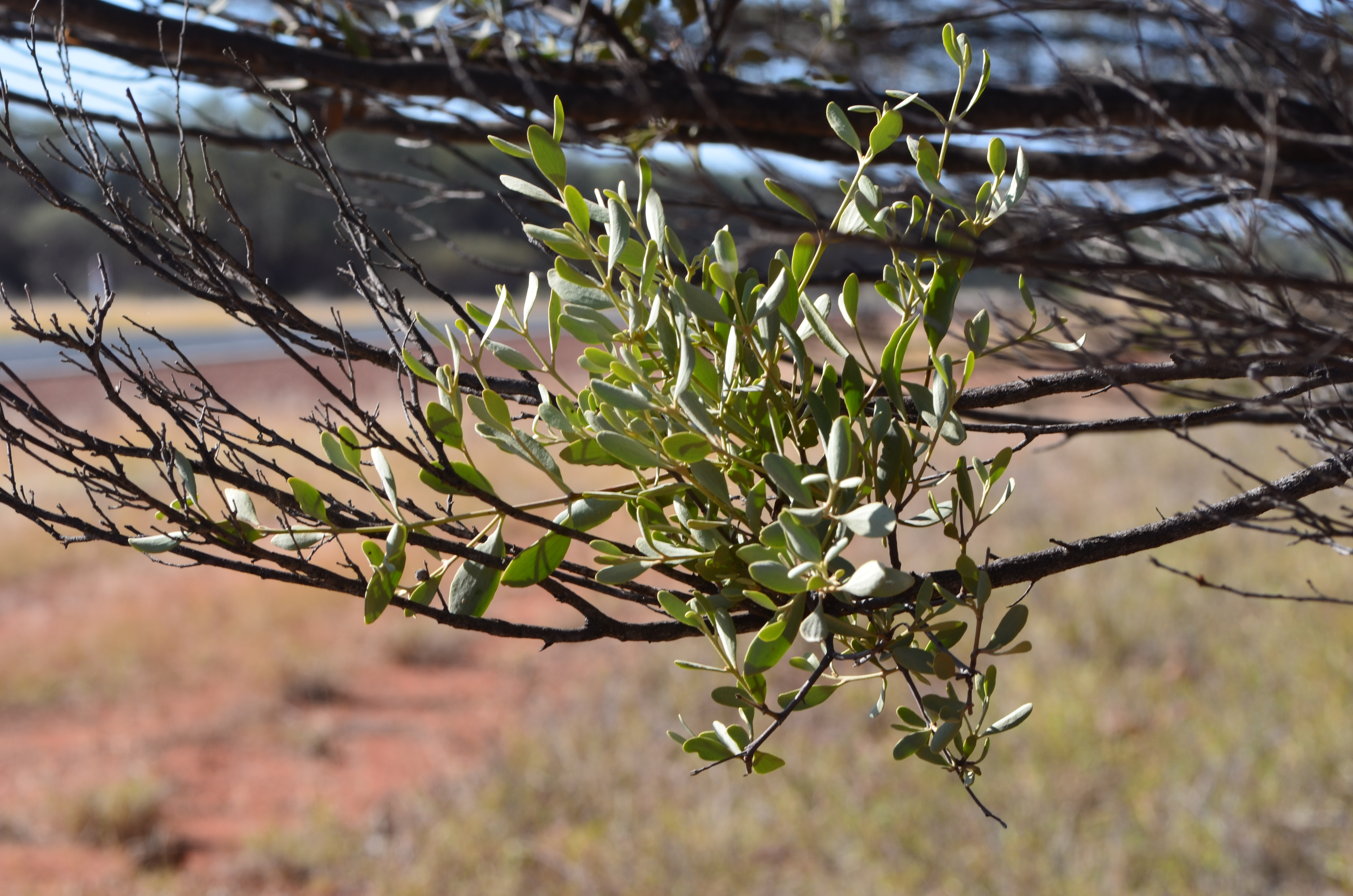
A. maidenii on mulga (Acacia aneura)

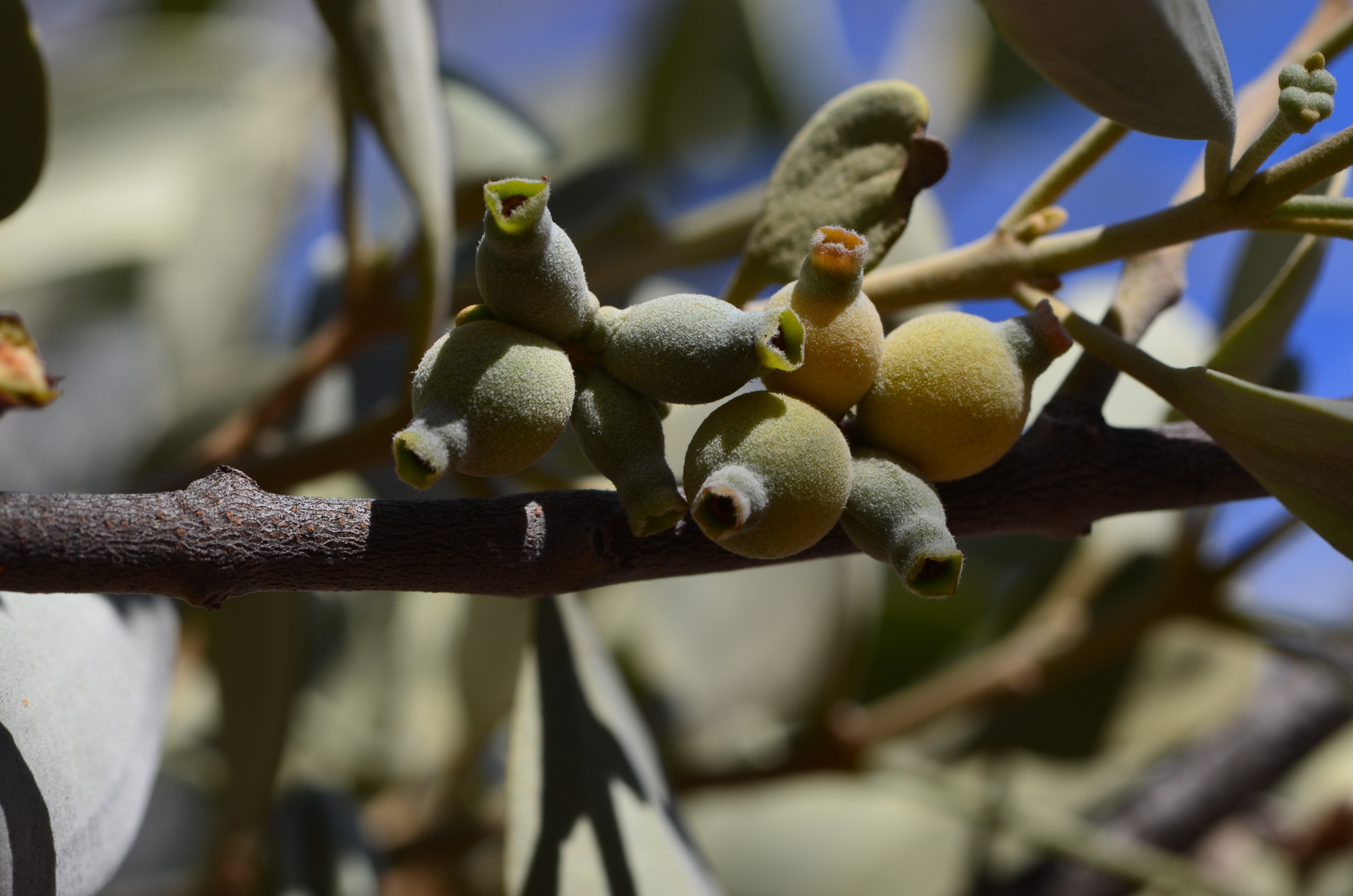
A. maidenii: fruit

== Description ==
Its inflorescence is composed of two opposite triads, with all the flowers being sessile. The leaves are flat.

== Ecology ==
A. maidenii is found on Acacias.

== Taxonomy ==
The earliest record in an Australian herbarium is MEL 22373491, which was collected in 1860 by Hermann Beckler on the Scropes Range (about 57 km north of Menindee) during the Victorian Exploring expedition. It was first described by Blakely in 1922 as Loranthus maidenii, but in 1962 was placed in the genus Amyema by Barlow.
