= Amyema thalassia =

Scientific classification
- Kingdom: Plantae
- Clade: Tracheophytes
- Clade: Angiosperms
- Clade: Eudicots
- Order: Santalales
- Family: Loranthaceae
- Genus: Amyema
- Species: A. thalassia

Binomial name
- Amyema thalassia Barlow

Species of epiphyte

Amyema thalassia is a species of mistletoe in the family Loranthaceae native to Western Australia and the Northern Territory.

It was first described in 1962 by Bryan Alwyn Barlow.

== Description ==
The leaves are rounded and fleshy, with an obtuse base, a blunt apex and a winged petiole. The corolla is four-winged, and red at the base and green at the apex. There are four stamens.
