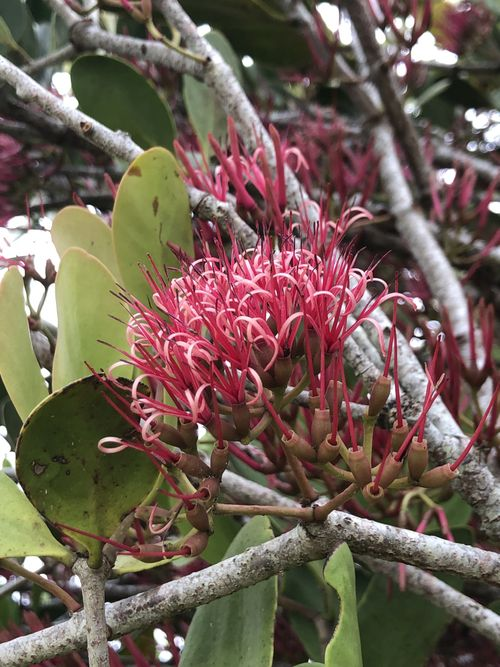
- (Image by Samuel Frankel)

Conservation status
- Endangered (EPBC Act)

Scientific classification
- Kingdom: Plantae
- Clade: Tracheophytes
- Clade: Angiosperms
- Clade: Eudicots
- Order: Santalales
- Family: Loranthaceae
- Genus: Amyema
- Species: A. plicatula

Binomial name
- Amyema plicatula (K.Krause) Danser

Synonyms
- Amyema angularis Barlow; Amyema cephalanthera Danser; Amyema duurenii Barlow; Amyema obovata Danser; Amyema ovariosa Danser; Amyema pentactis Danser; Amyema scandens subsp. plicatula (K.Krause) Barlow; Loranthus plicatulus K.Krause

= Amyema plicatula =

Species of plant

Amyema plicatula is a species of hemi-parasitic shrub found in the Bismarck Archipelago, New Guinea, New South Wales and Queensland.

== Description ==
It is an aerial stem-parasitic shrub, with short epicortical runners. The leaves, which are usually opposite, are elliptic to obovate, and about 5.5–11 cm by 3–8 cm, with no obvious venation. They sometimes occur in whorls of 3 to 4, on short stalks which are 0.4-0.8 cm long.

The flowers occur in umbels. The primary stalk of the inflorescence is about 12–20 mm long, with the stalks in the umbels being about 5–10 mm long. The flowers in their diads or triads are stalkless. The calyx lobes are inconspicuous or non-existent. The corolla lobes are red, and about 20–23 mm by 8–10 mm. The anthers are about 3 mm long on anther filaments which are about 8 mm long. The style is about 20 mm long.

The ovary is about 2–3 mm long, and the fruits are ellipsoid to obovoid, about 7–10 mm long, and the calyx limb and style often persists at the apex of the fruit.

== Distribution ==
In New South Wales it is found in remnant rainforests of the North Coast. In Queensland it is known from just one collection in the north east Outside Australia it has been found in rainforests and open humid forests from sea level to 1600 metres.

== Taxonomy ==
Amyema plicatula is member of the Santalales, the mistletoe order, placed within the family Loranthaceae. It was first described as Loranthus plicatulus by Kurt Krause from a specimen collected in New Guinea, but was transferred from the genus Loranthus in 1929 by Danser.

The genus name, Amyema, is derived from Greek for 'without' and 'to instruct'.

== Host plants ==
Downey records just one host, Dysoxylum fraseranum, in the Meliaceae family.
