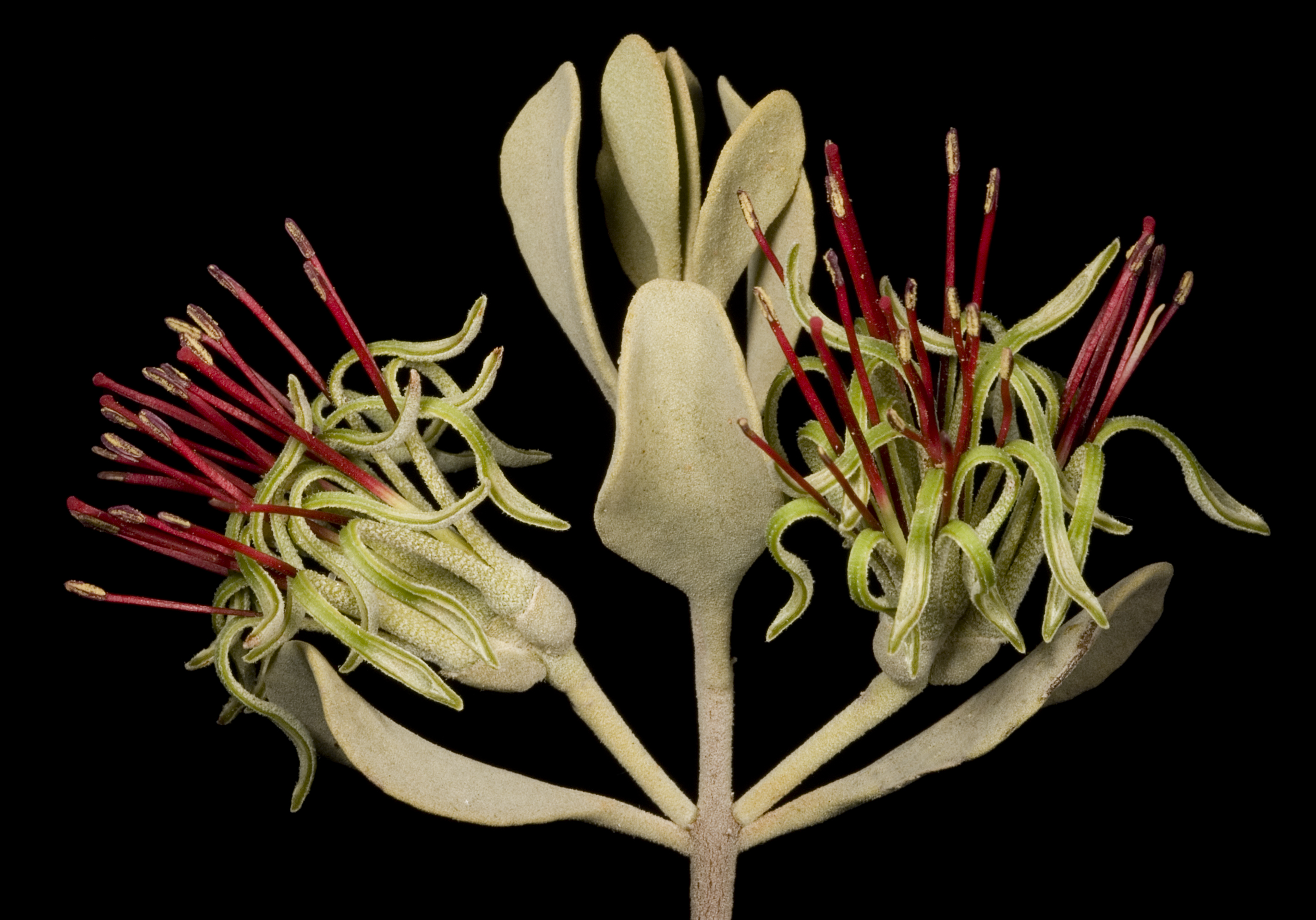
- Amyema fitzgeraldii
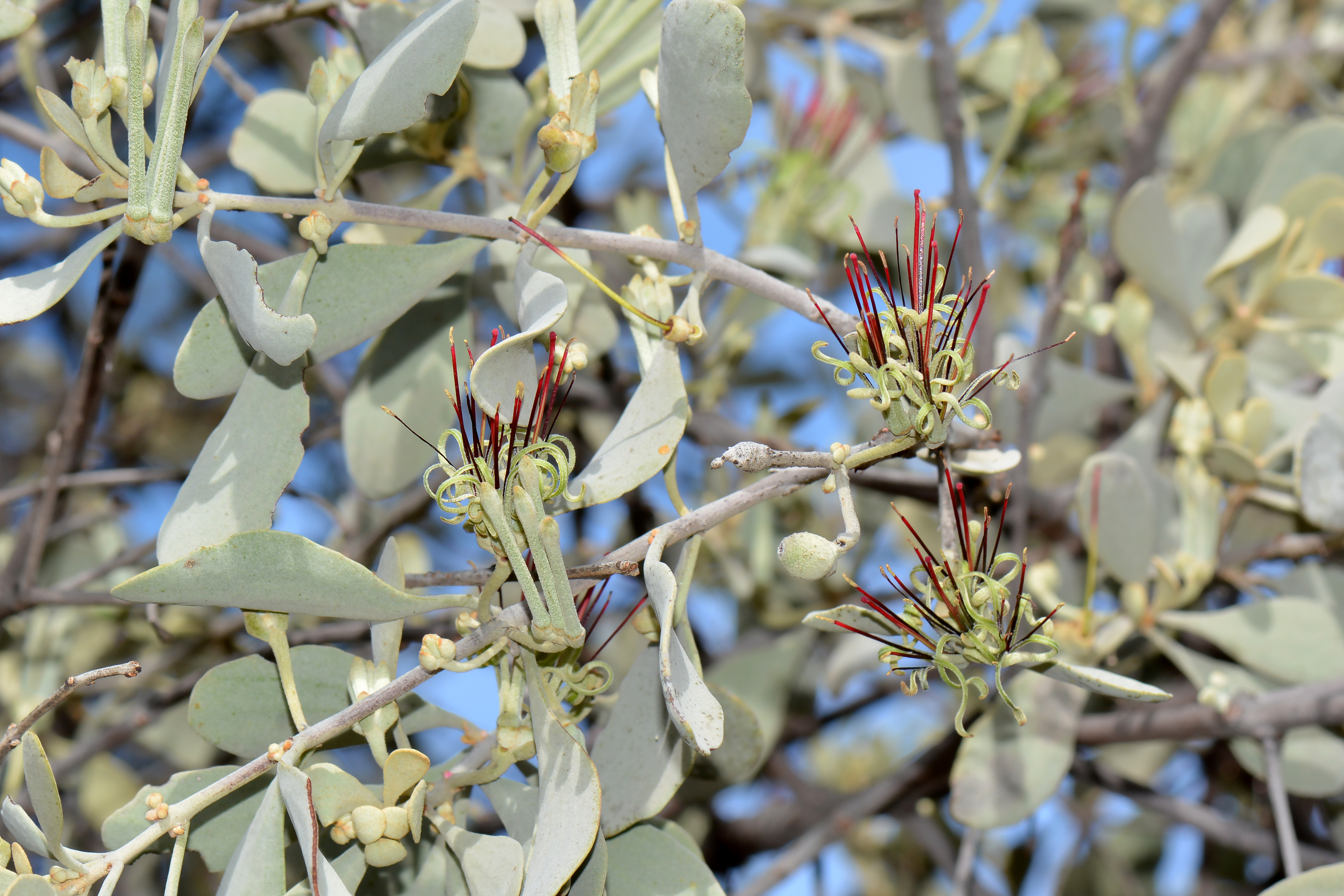

Scientific classification
- Kingdom: Plantae
- Clade: Tracheophytes
- Clade: Angiosperms
- Clade: Eudicots
- Order: Santalales
- Family: Loranthaceae
- Genus: Amyema
- Species: A. fitzgeraldii

Binomial name
- Amyema fitzgeraldii (Blakely) Danser
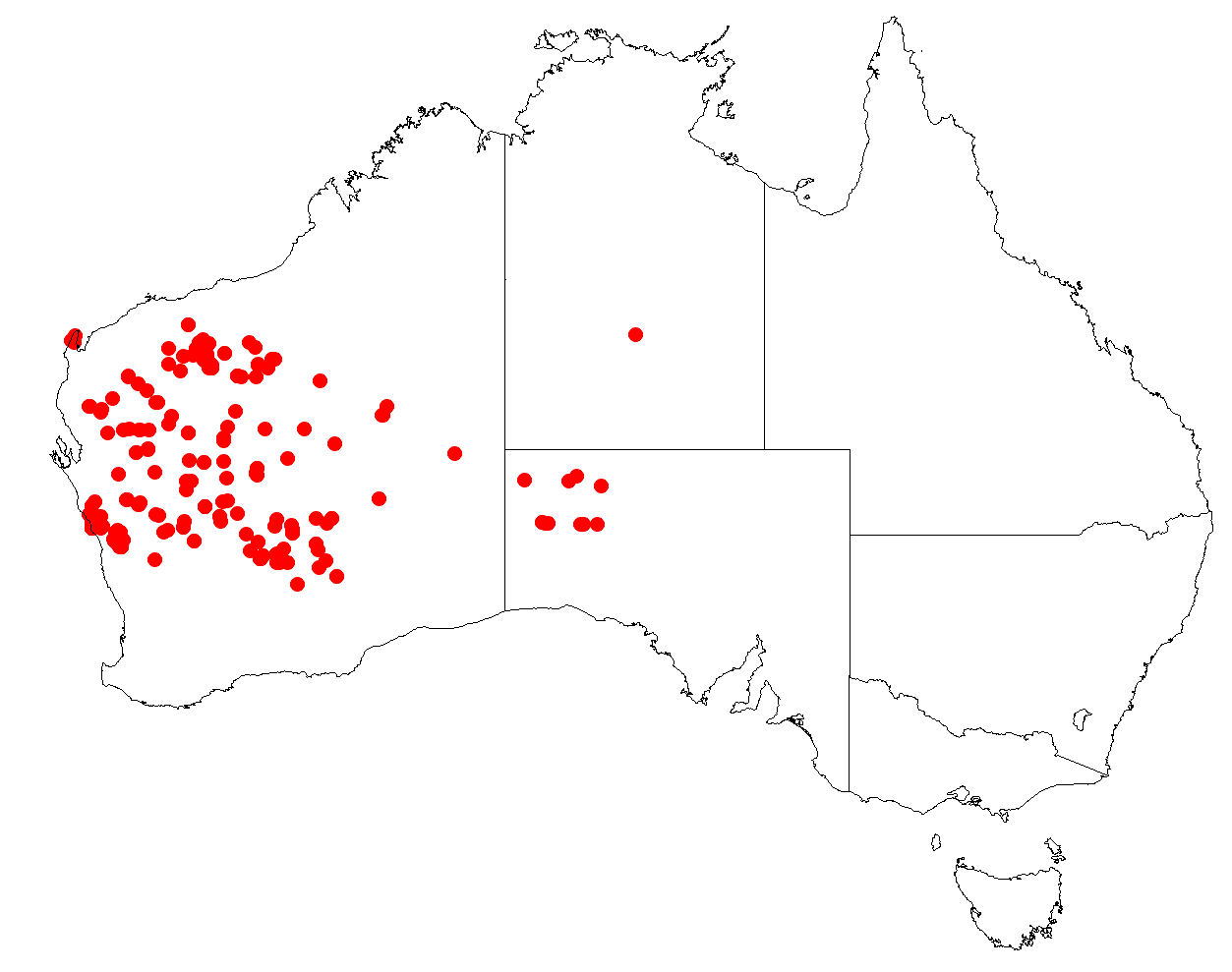
- Collections data for A. fitzgeraldii from the Australasian Virtual Herbarium

= Amyema fitzgeraldii =

Species of plant

Amyema fitzgeraldii, the pincushion mistletoe, is a species of flowering plant within the genus Amyema, an epiphytic hemiparasitic plant of the family Loranthaceae endemic to Australia, and found in the Northern Territory, South Australia and Western Australia.

== Description ==
The leaves are flat. The inflorescence is a single group of 3-5 green and red flowers. The central flower has no bracts, unlike the surrounding flowers. It flowers from April to October.

== Ecology ==
A. fitzgeraldii is only found on Acacias.

== Taxonomy ==
A. fitzgeraldii was first described by Blakely in 1922 as Loranthus fitzgeraldii, but in 1929 was placed in the genus Amyema by Danser.
