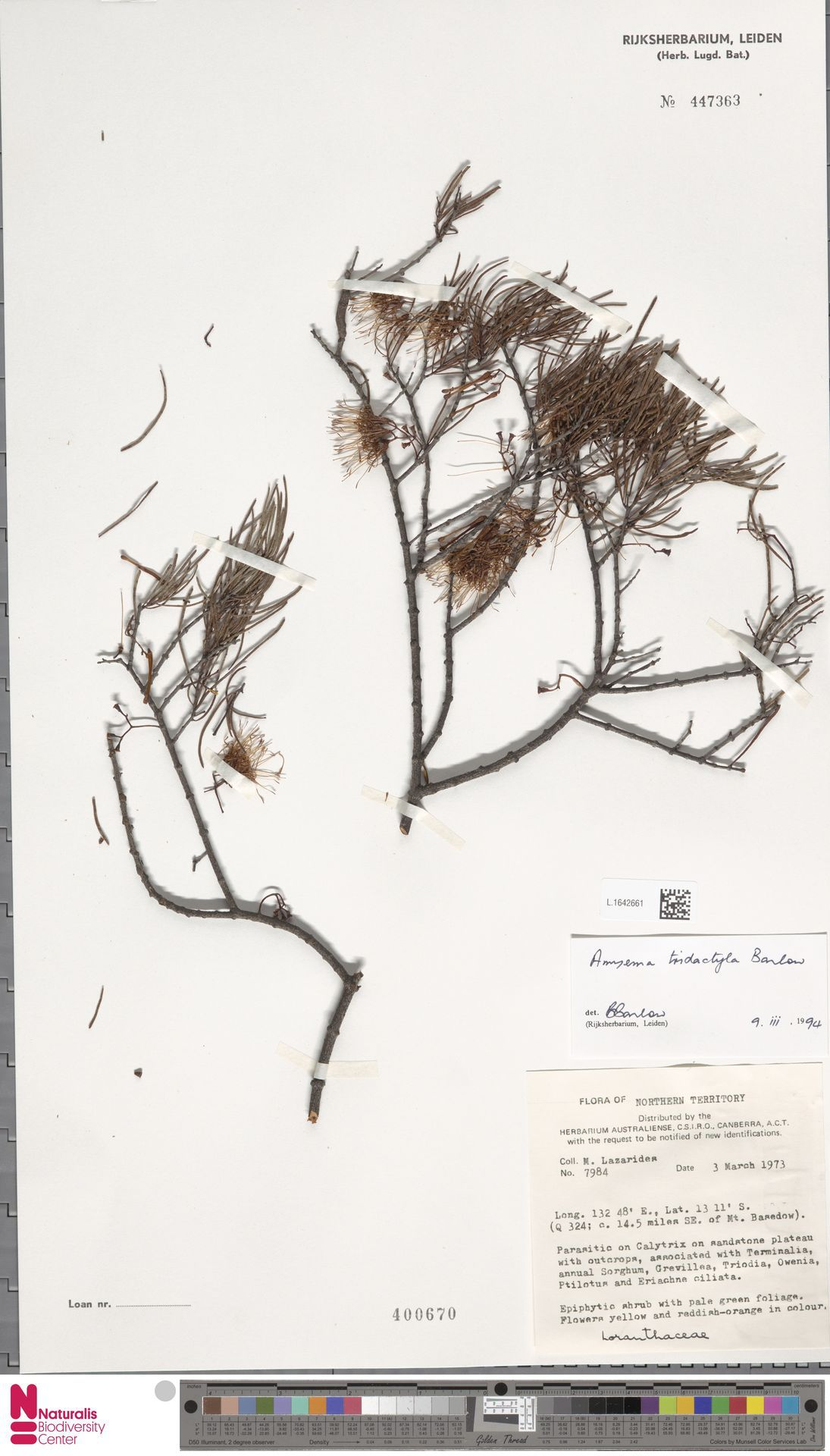

Scientific classification
- Kingdom: Plantae
- Clade: Tracheophytes
- Clade: Angiosperms
- Clade: Eudicots
- Order: Santalales
- Family: Loranthaceae
- Genus: Amyema
- Species: A. tridactyla

Binomial name
- Amyema tridactyla Barlow
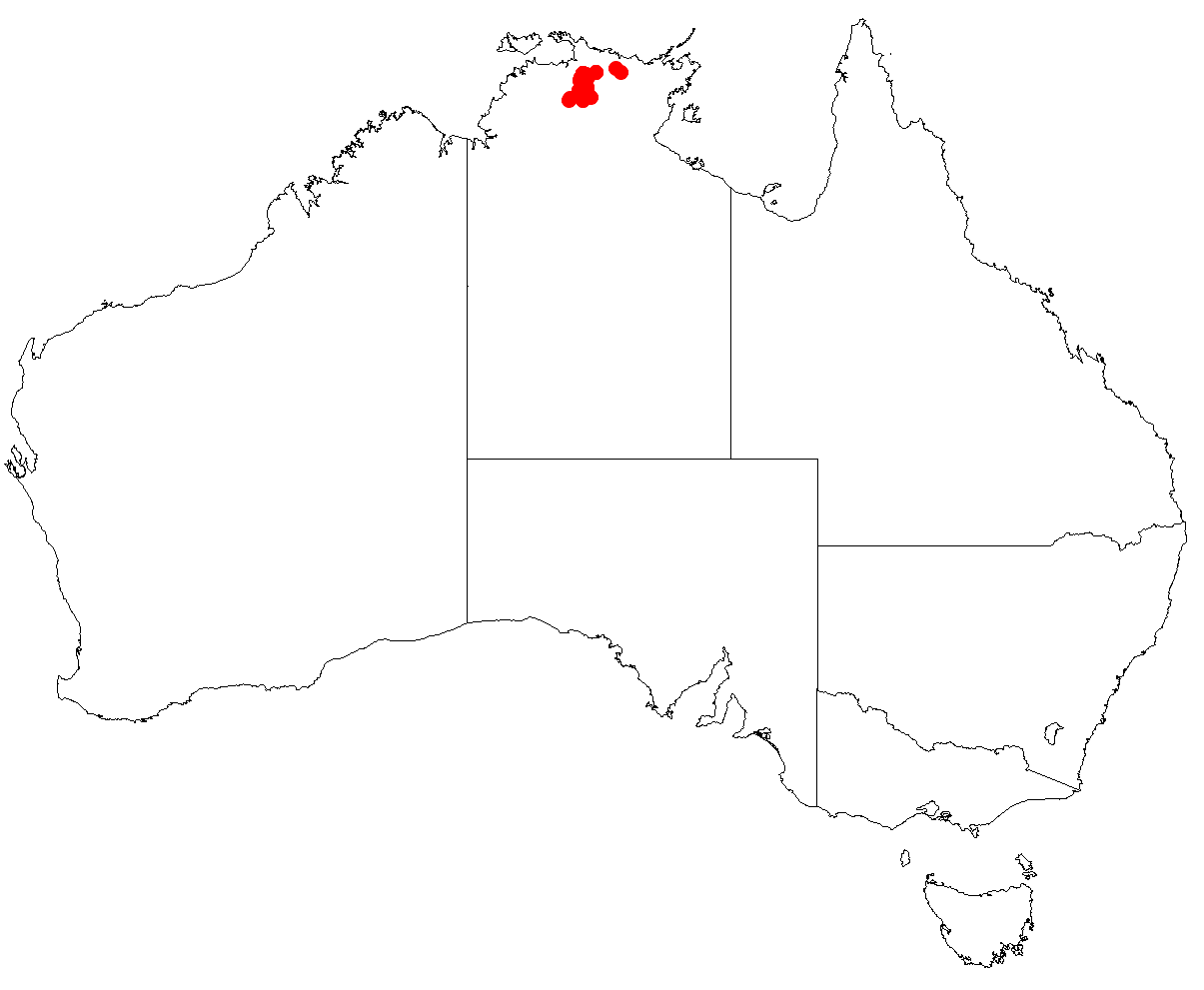
- Occurrence data from AVH

= Amyema tridactyla =

Species of epiphyte

Amyema tridactyla is a species of mistletoe in the family Loranthaceae native to the Northern Territory, first described by Bryan Alwyn Barlow in 1983.
