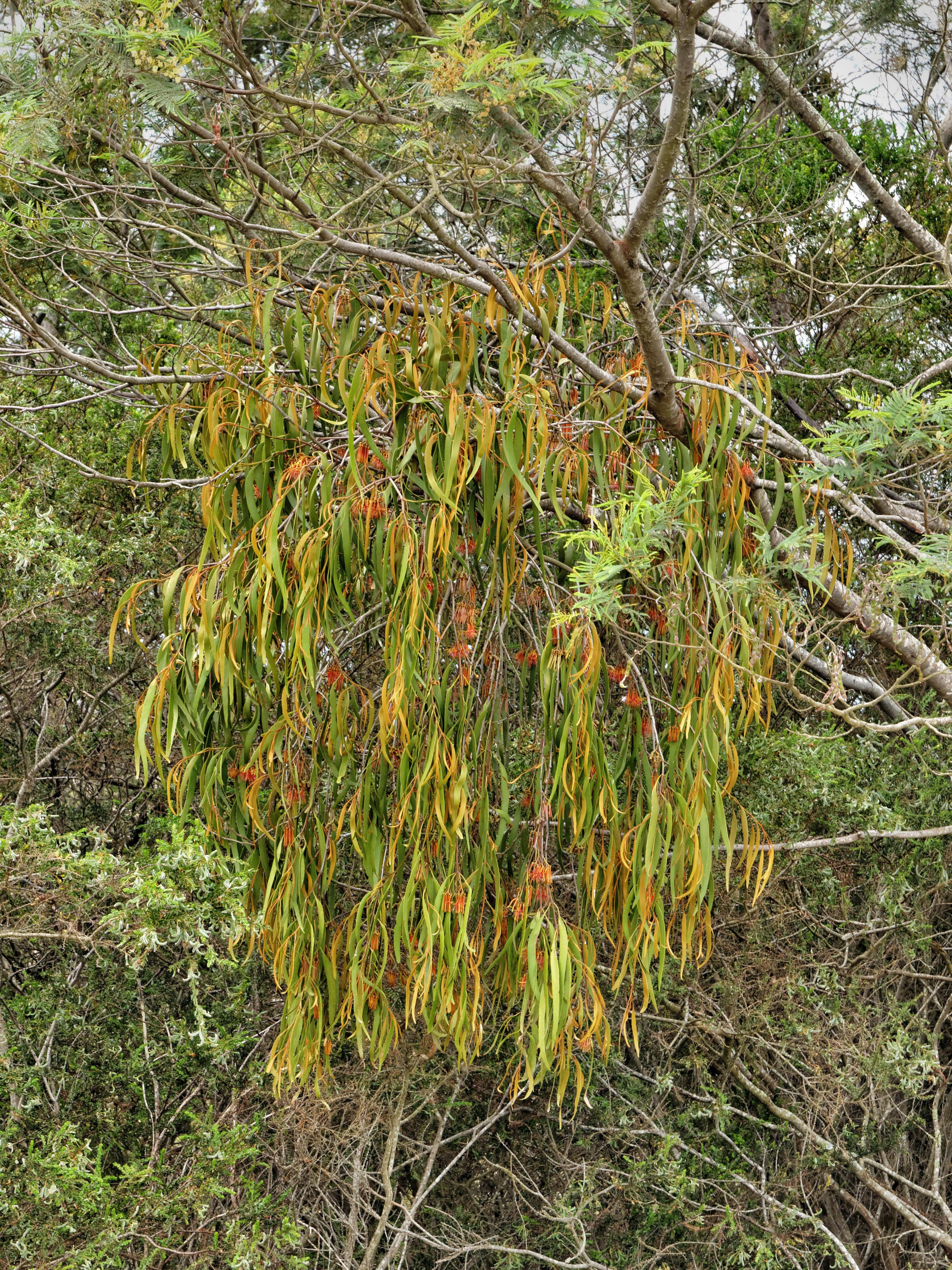
- ↑A. pendula, habit; ↓A. gibberula, flowers
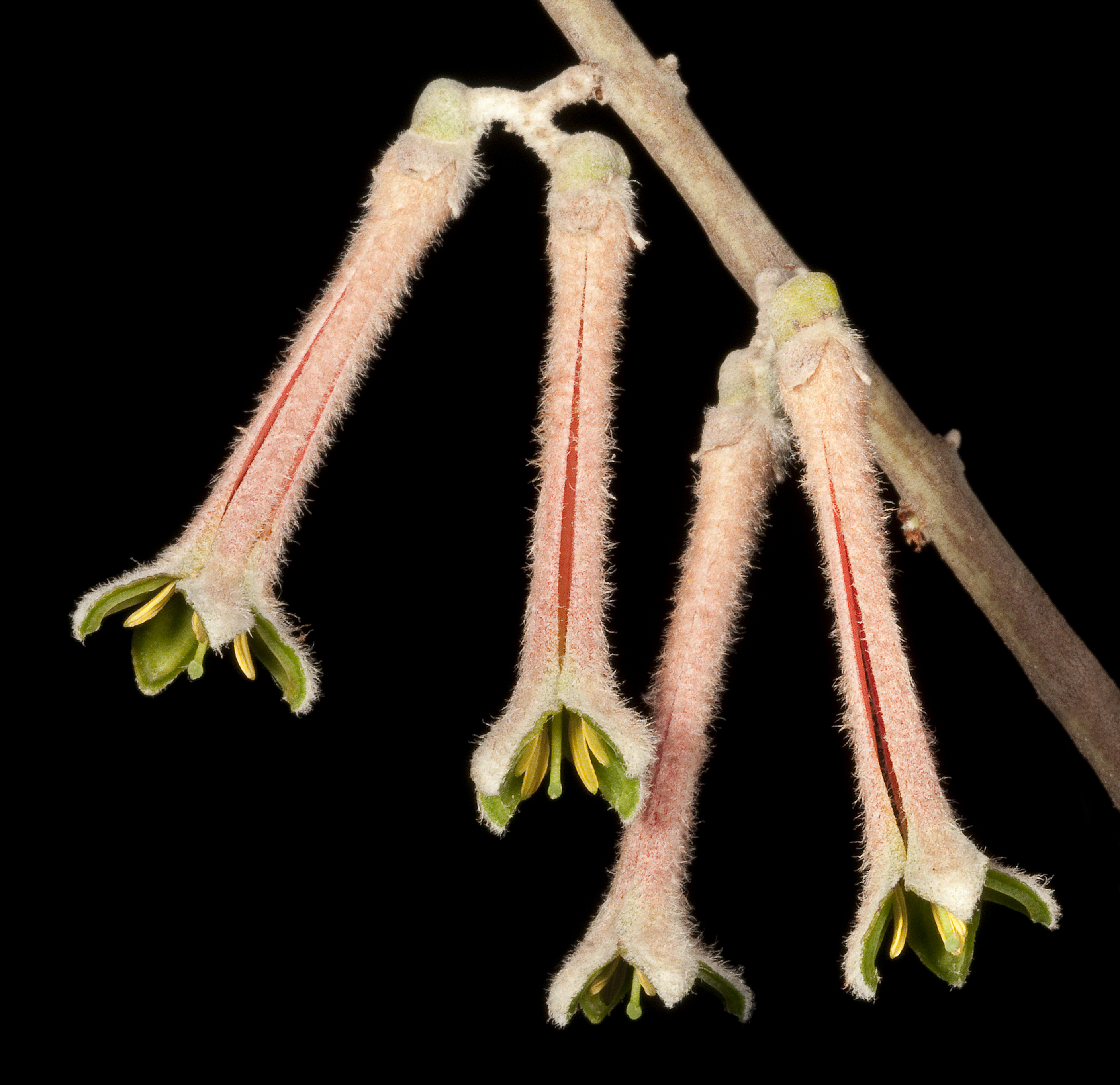
- Amyema gibberula var. gibberula

Scientific classification
- Kingdom: Plantae
- Clade: Tracheophytes
- Clade: Angiosperms
- Clade: Eudicots
- Order: Santalales
- Family: Loranthaceae
- Genus: Amyema; Tiegh.

Species
- See text

Synonyms
- Loranthus sect. Amyema Endl.; Loranthus sect. Pilostigma Engl.; Pilostigma Tiegh.; Xylochlamys Domin

= Amyema =

Genus of mistletoes

Amyema is a genus of semi-parasitic shrubs (mistletoes) which occur in Malesia and Australia.

== Etymology ==
Amyema derives from the Greek: a (negative), and myeo (I initiate), referring to the genus being previously unrecognised.

== Description ==
Hamilton & Barlow describe the haustorial structures of most Australian Amyemas as being ball-like, with some exceptions.

== Species ==
There are approximately 90 species including the following:

- Amyema arthrocaulis Barlow
- Amyema artensis (Mont.) Dan. (indigenous to Upolu and Savai'i, known as tapuna.)
- Amyema benthamii (Blakely) Danser
- Amyema betchei (Blakely) Danser
- Amyema bifurcata (Benth.) Tiegh.
- Amyema biniflora Barlow
- Amyema brassii Barlow
- Amyema brevipes (Tiegh.) Danser
- Amyema cambagei (Blakely) Danser
- Amyema congener (Sieber ex Schult. & Schult.f.) Tiegh.
- Amyema conspicua (F.M.Bailey) Danser
- Amyema dolichopoda Barlow
- Amyema duurenii Barlow
- Amyema eburna (Barlow) Barlow
- Amyema fitzgeraldii (Blakely) Danser - pincushion mistletoe
- Amyema gaudichaudii (DC.) Tiegh.
- Amyema gibberula (Tate) Danser
- Amyema glabra (Domin) Danser
- Amyema haematodes (O.Schwarz) Danser
- Amyema herbertiana Barlow
- Amyema hilliana (Blakely) Danser
- Amyema linophylla (Fenzl) Tiegh.
- Amyema lisae Pelser & Barcelona
- Amyema lucasii (Blakely) Danser
- Amyema mackayensis (Blakely) Danser
- Amyema maidenii (Blakely) Barlow
- Amyema melaleucae (Lehm. ex Miq.) Tiegh.
- Amyema microphylla Barlow
- Amyema miquelii (Lehm. ex Miq.) Tiegh. - stalked mistletoe
- Amyema miraculosa (Miq.) Tiegh.
- Amyema nestor (S.Moore) Danser
- Amyema nickrentii Barcelona & Pelser
- Amyema pendula (Sieber ex Spreng.) Tiegh. - drooping mistletoe
- Amyema plicatula (K.Krause) Danser
- Amyema preissii (Miq.) Tiegh. - wireleaf mistletoe
- Amyema quandang (Lindl.) Tiegh.
- Amyema quaternifolia Barlow
- Amyema queenslandica (Blakely) Danser
- Amyema sanguinea (F.Muell.) Danser
- Amyema seemeniana (K.Schum.) Danser
- Amyema subcapitata Barlow
- Amyema tetraflora (Barlow) Barlow
- Amyema tetrapetala (Danser) Barlow
- Amyema thalassia Barlow
- Amyema tridactyla Barlow
- Amyema tristis (Zoll.) Tiegh.
- Amyema verticillata (Merr.) Danser
- Amyema villiflora (Domin) Barlow
- Amyema whitei (Blakely) Danser

== Faunal associations ==
The mistletoebird is known to consume the fruit of Amyema quandang as well as other mistletoe species from which its name is derived.

Larvae of the butterfly genus Delias often use various Amyema species as larval food plants. In doing so, the adults acquire a taste that is unpalatable to predators.

== Uses ==
The fruit of Amyema species is high in protein, lipids, and carbohydrates, and was eaten by the Ngunnawal people.
