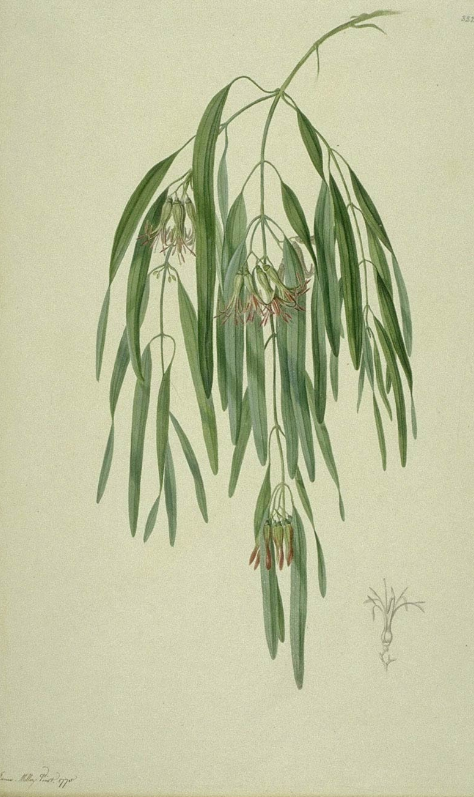
- Amyema biniflora (artist: James F. Miller, 1775)

Scientific classification
- Kingdom: Plantae
- Clade: Tracheophytes
- Clade: Angiosperms
- Clade: Eudicots
- Order: Santalales
- Family: Loranthaceae
- Genus: Amyema
- Species: A. biniflora

Binomial name
- Amyema biniflora Barlow
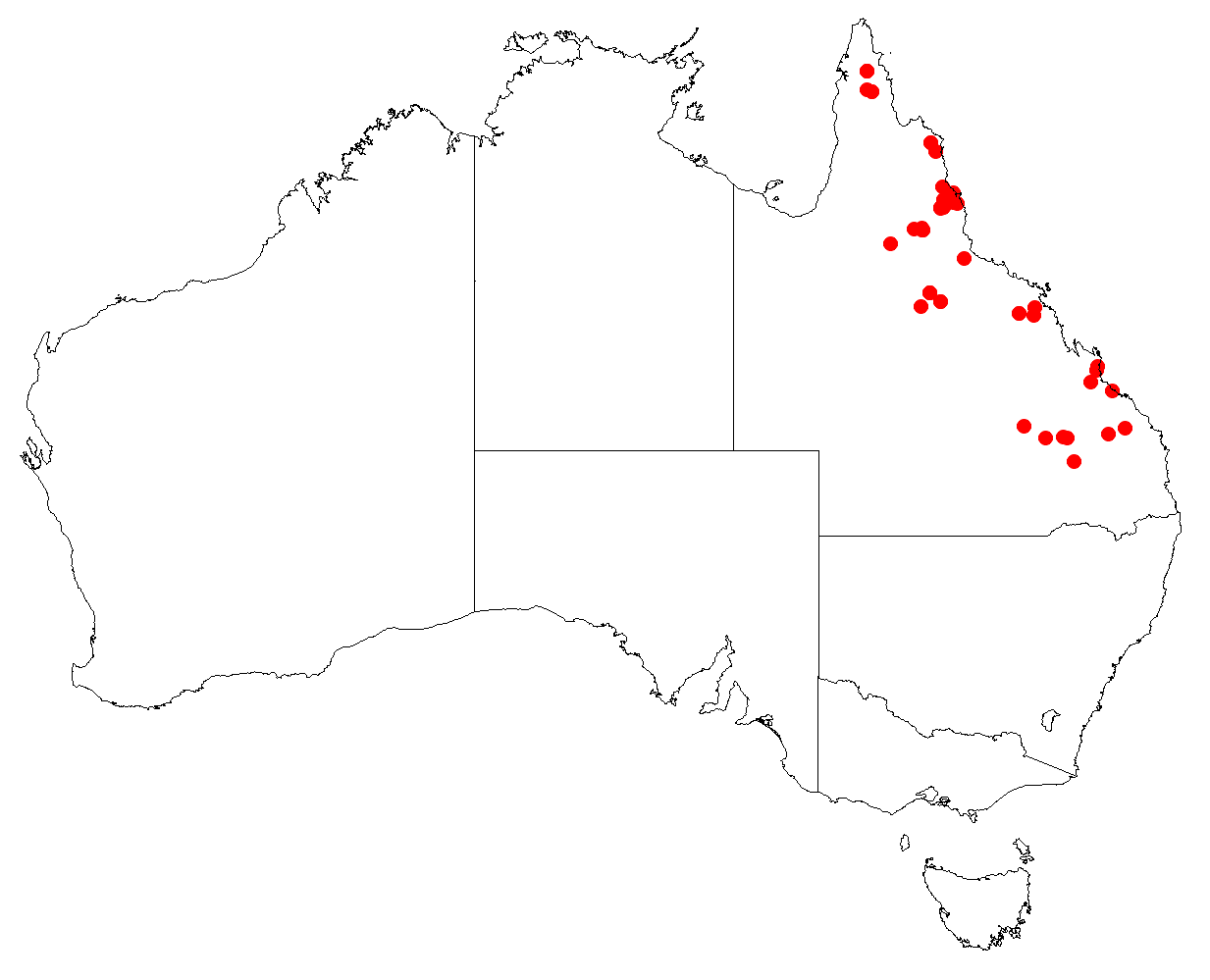
- Collections data for A. biniflora from the Australasian Virtual Herbarium

= Amyema biniflora =

Species of epiphyte

Amyema biniflora, the twin-flower mistletoe, is a species of epiphytic hemiparasitic plant of the family Loranthaceae endemic to Queensland, Australia.

== Type species ==
Type: Endeavour R., Banks & Solander, 1770 (BM, holotype; MEL; NSW).

== Description ==
A. biniflora is a pendulous mistletoe, with flat leaves up 15 cm long and 1 cm wide. Its inflorescence is an umbel of two or dyads (flowering in groups of two). The corolla is smooth and slender and green at maturity. The fruit is ovoid and the flower bract does not enlarge as the fruit matures. The buds and fruit are smooth.

== Ecology ==
A. biniflora is found on bloodwoods and spotted gums (eucalypts).

== Taxonomy ==
A. biniflora was first described by Barlow in 1966.
