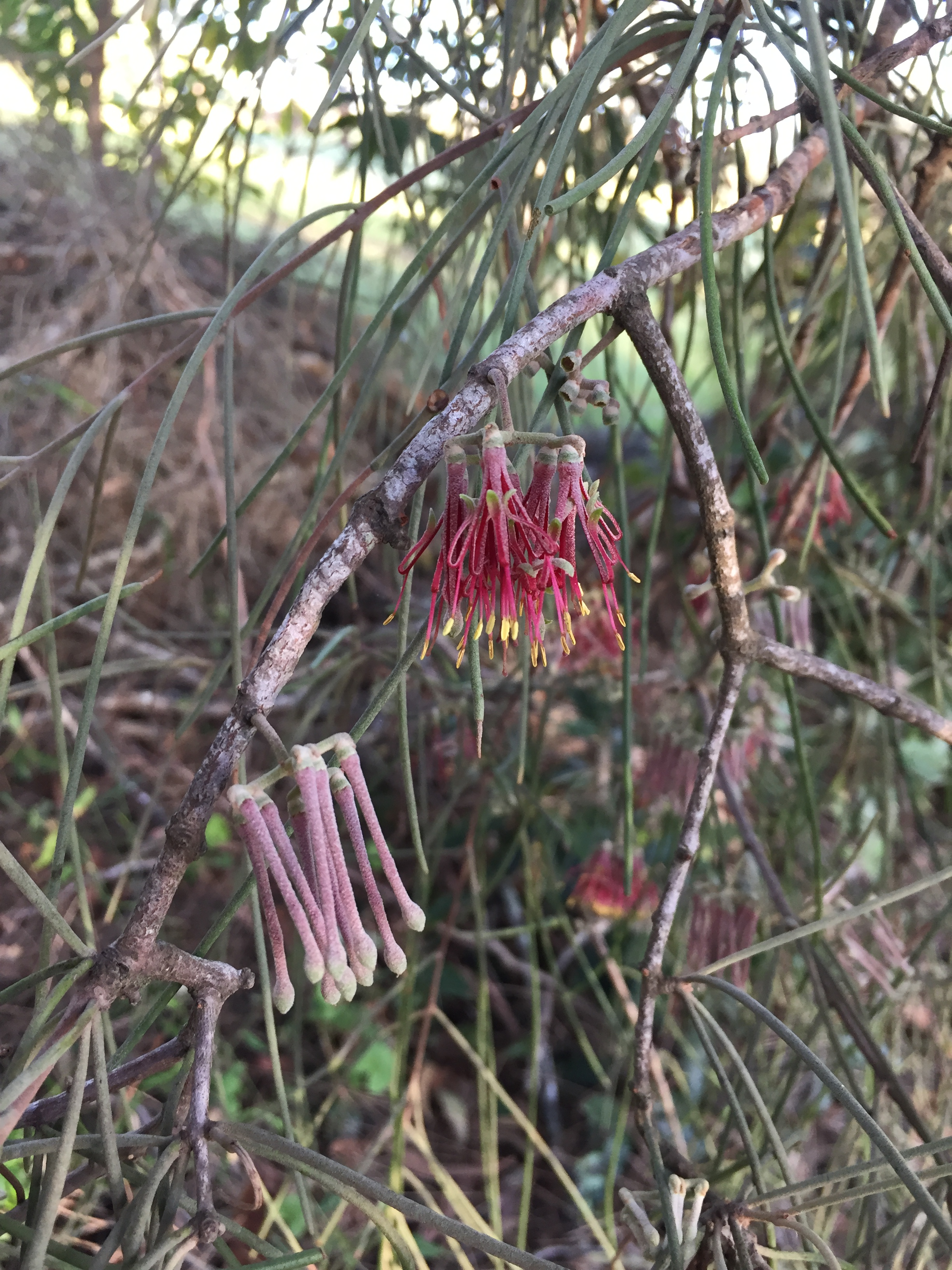

Scientific classification
- Kingdom: Plantae
- Clade: Tracheophytes
- Clade: Angiosperms
- Clade: Eudicots
- Order: Santalales
- Family: Loranthaceae
- Genus: Amyema
- Species: A. cambagei

Binomial name
- Amyema cambagei (Blakely) Danser.
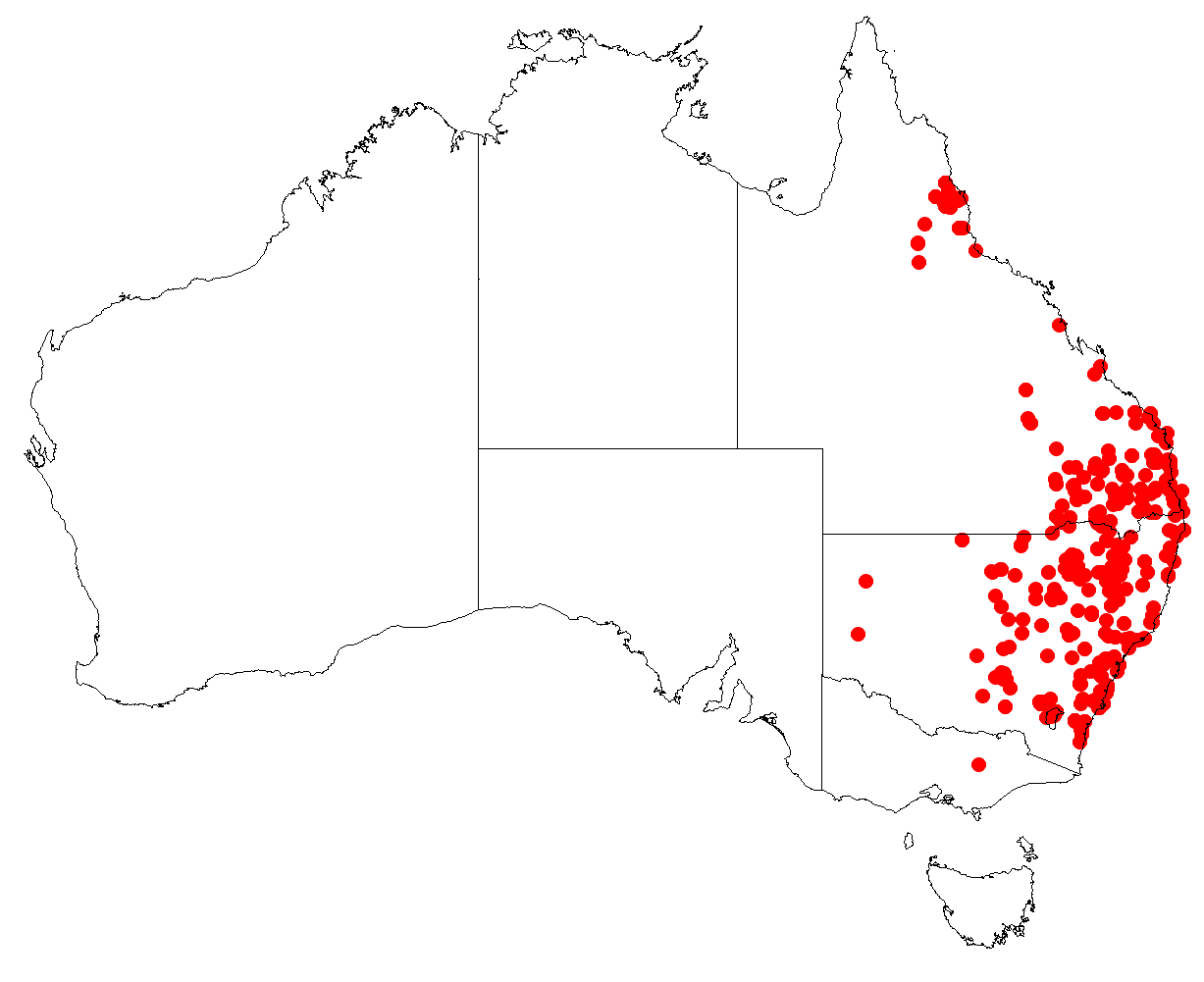
- Collections data for A. cambagei from the Australasian Virtual Herbarium

= Amyema cambagei =

Species of epiphyte

Amyema cambagei, commonly known as sheoak mistletoe, is a species of flowering plant, an epiphytic hemiparasitic plant of the family Loranthaceae endemic to Australia, and found in New South Wales and Queensland in sclerophyll forest and woodland on several species of Casuarinaceae.

== Description ==
This mistletoe is spreading to pendulous plant with grey hairy stems. Leaves are terete, usually 6–15 cm long and 1–1.5 mm wide. The flowers are 15-21mm long and are pink with white hairs. Flowers appear in winter to early summer (June to December). Fruits are globular, pink to red, 5–6 mm diam.

== Ecology ==
A. cambagei is found on Casuarina & Allocasuarina spp., mimicking the leaves of the host.

== Taxonomy ==
A. cambagei was first described by Blakely in 1922 as Loranthus cambagei, but in 1929 was placed in the genus Amyema by Danser.
