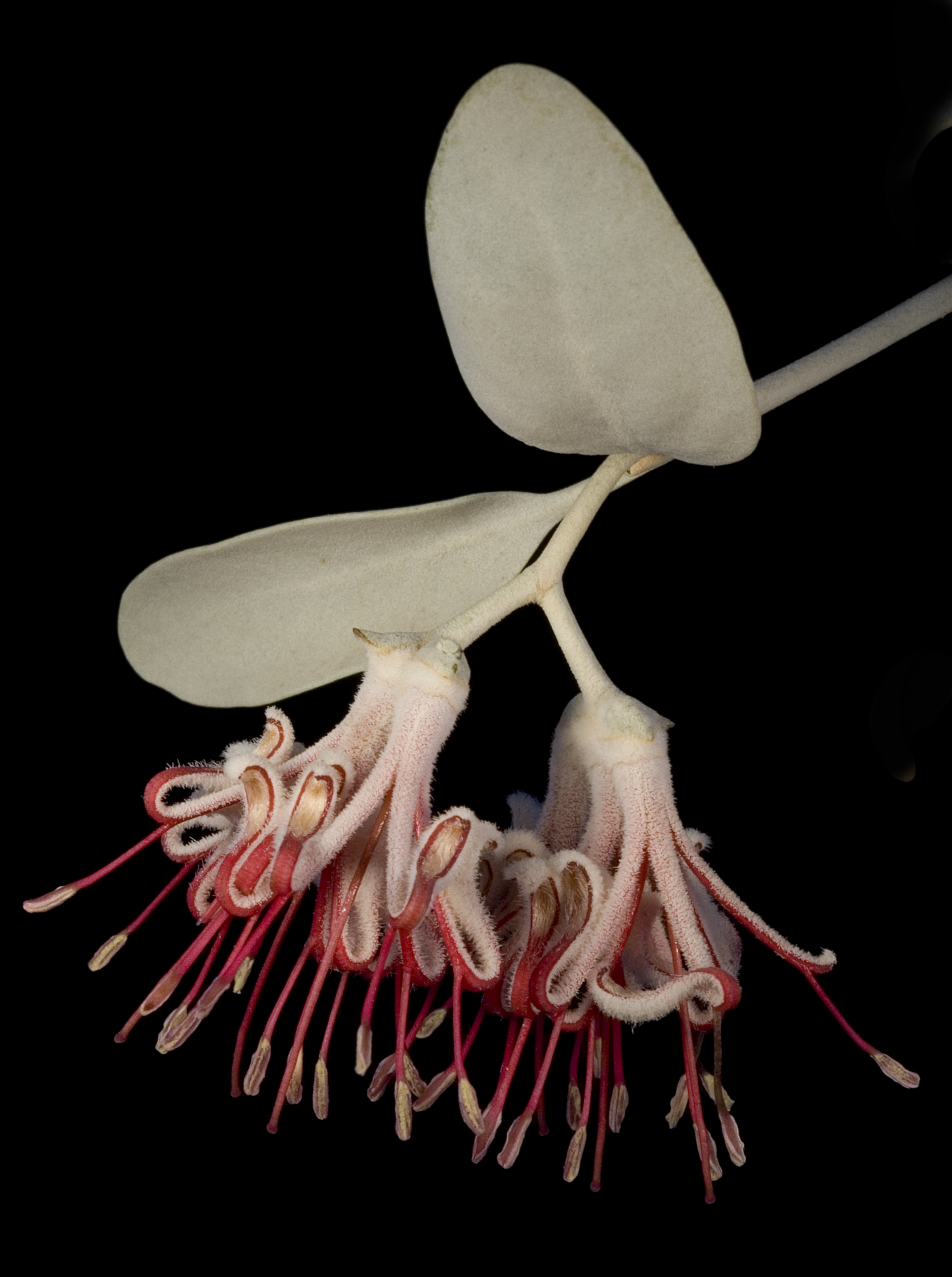

Scientific classification
- Kingdom: Plantae
- Clade: Tracheophytes
- Clade: Angiosperms
- Clade: Eudicots
- Order: Santalales
- Family: Loranthaceae
- Genus: Amyema
- Species: A. nestor

Binomial name
- Amyema nestor (S.Moore) Danser
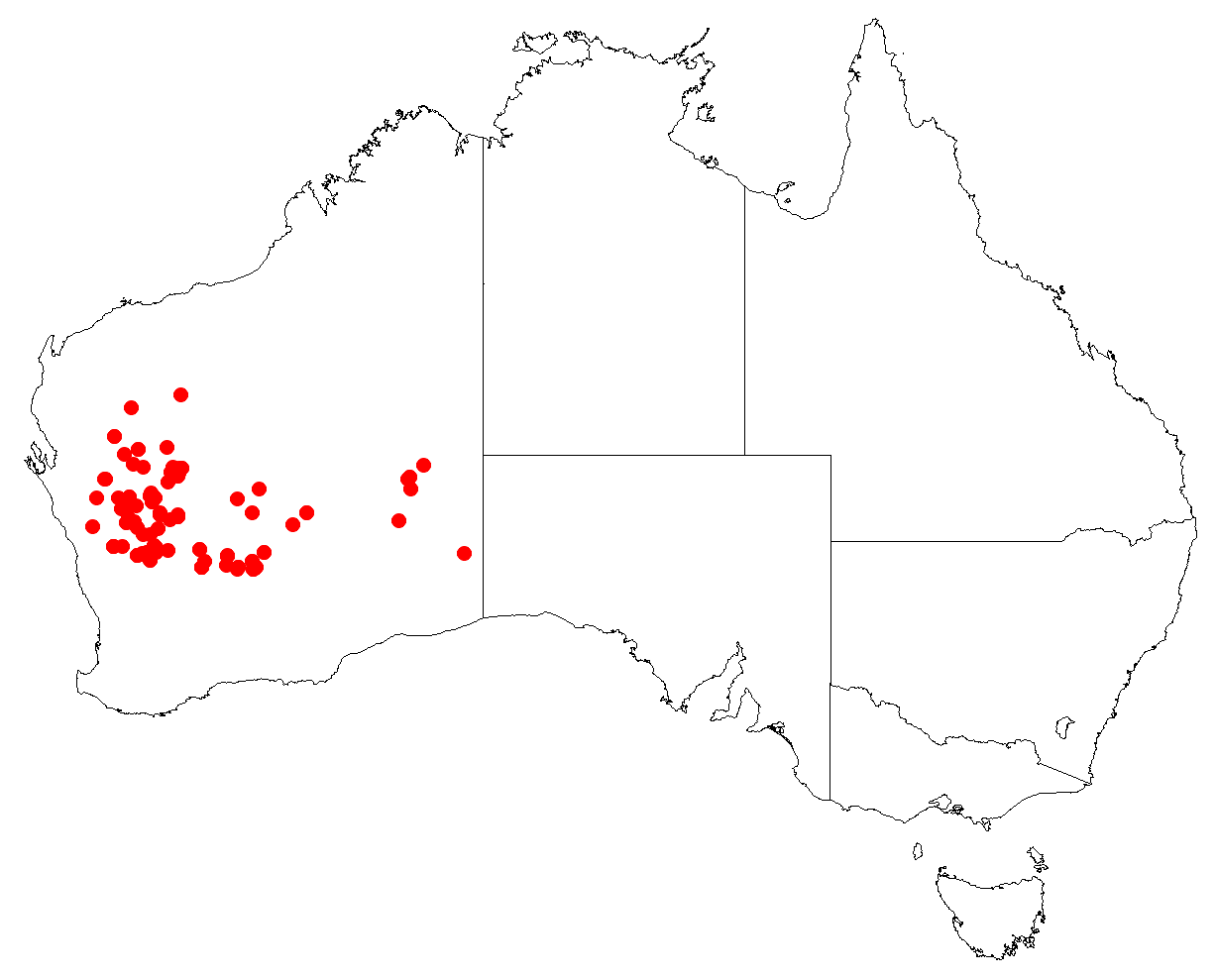
- Occurrence data from AVH

Synonyms
- Loranthus nestor S.Moore

= Amyema nestor =

Species of mistletoe

Amyema nestor is a species of epiphytic hemiparasitic plant in the family Loranthaceae. It is native to Western Australia, and found growing only on acacias.

The species was first described in 1897 as Loranthus nestor by Spencer Le Marchant Moore, but was transferred to the genus, Amyema, in 1929 by Benedictus Hubertus Danser.
