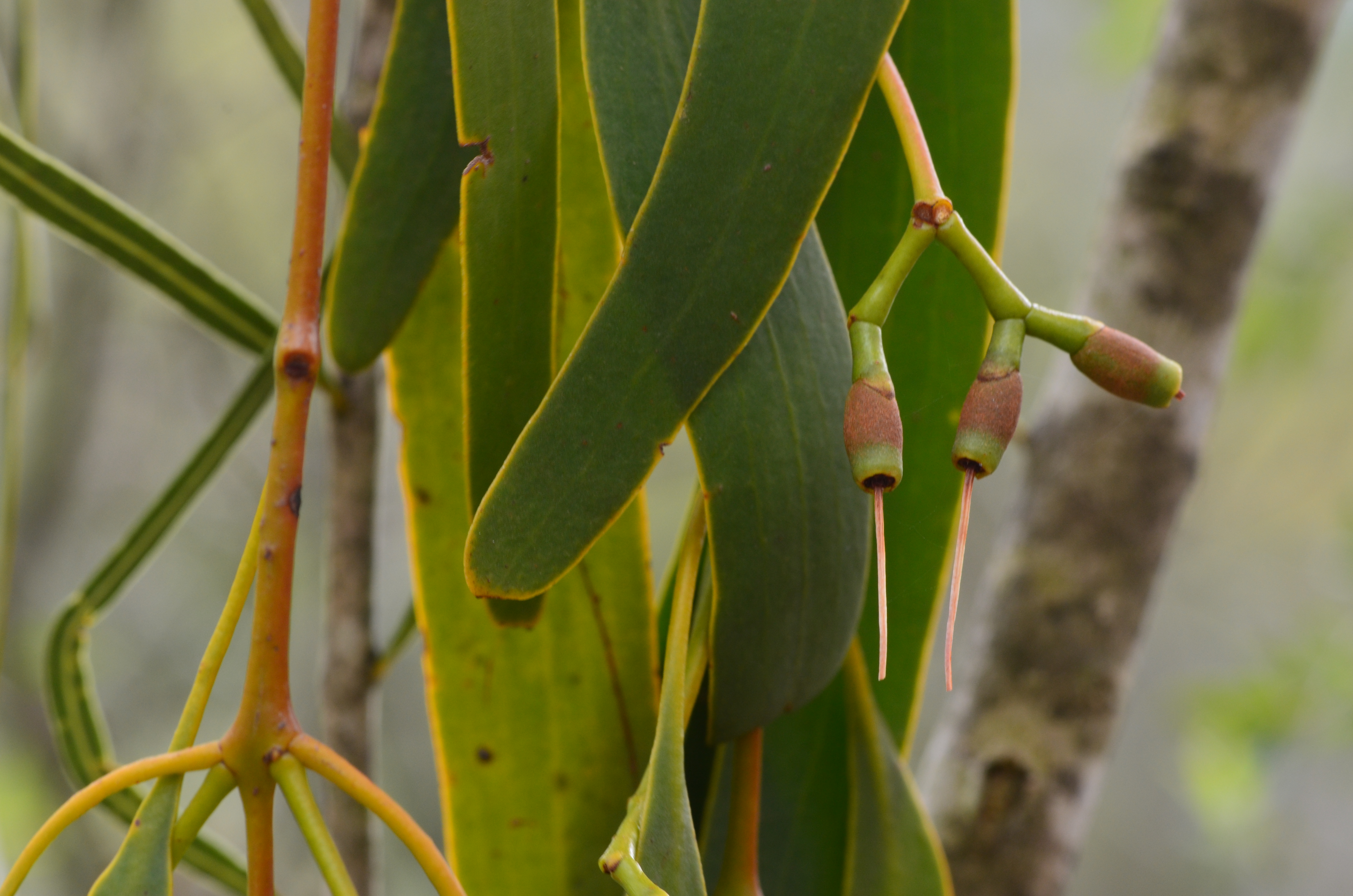
- Amyema bifurcata, Burning Mountain, New South Wales

Conservation status
- Least Concern (NCA)

Scientific classification
- Kingdom: Plantae
- Clade: Embryophytes
- Clade: Tracheophytes
- Clade: Spermatophytes
- Clade: Angiosperms
- Clade: Eudicots
- Order: Santalales
- Family: Loranthaceae
- Genus: Amyema
- Species: A. bifurcata

Binomial name
- Amyema bifurcata (Benth.) Tiegh.
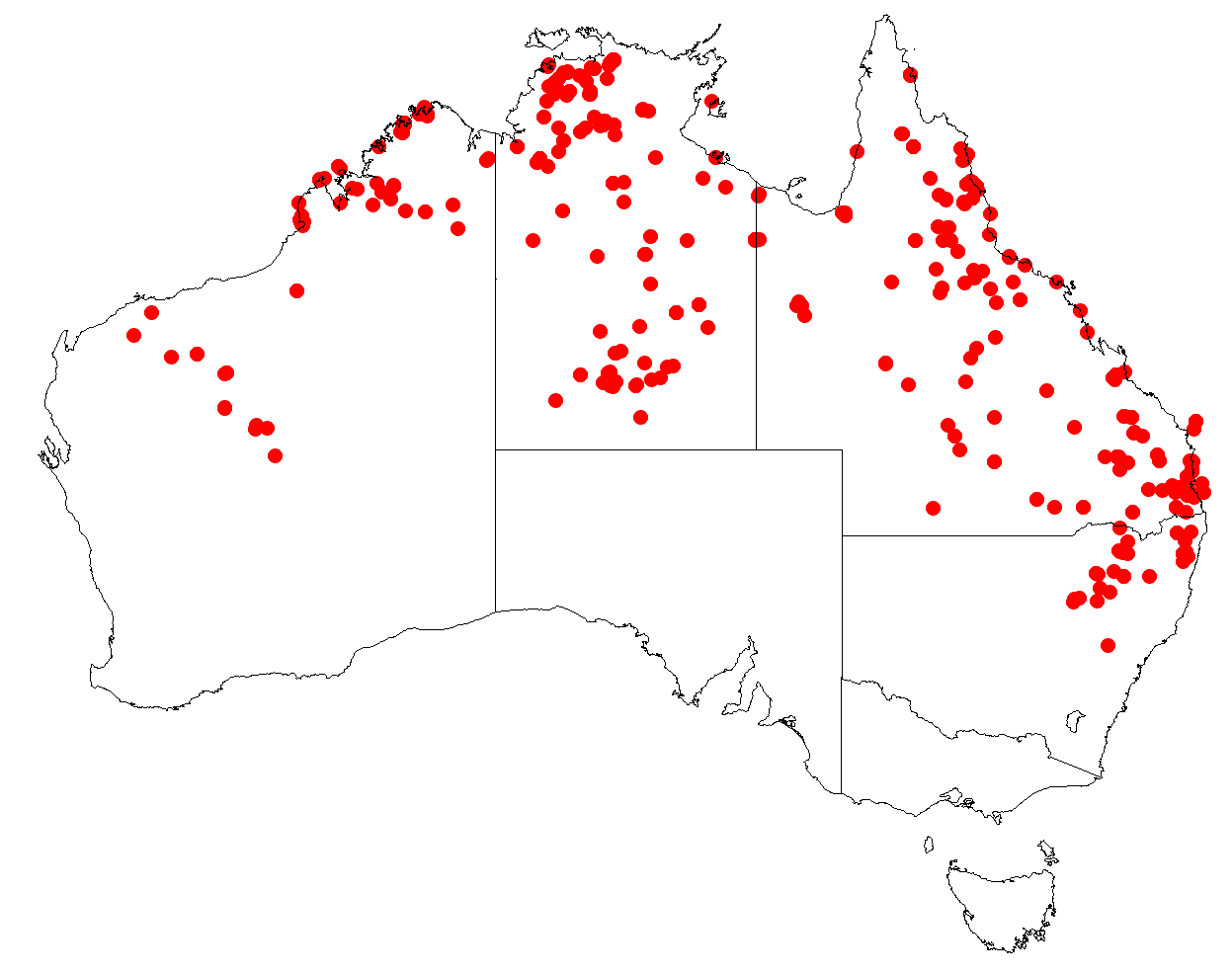
- Collections data for A. bifurcata from the Australasian Virtual Herbarium

Synonyms
- Amyema ferruginiflora (W.Fitzg.) Danser; Amyema xylochlamys Danser; Loranthus bifurcatus Benth. Loranthus ferruginiflorus W.Fitzg. Loranthus ferruginiflorus var. linearifolius Blakely; Loranthus pendulus var. taeniifolius Domin; Xylochlamys queenslandica Domin

= Amyema bifurcata =

Species of epiphyte

Amyema bifurcata is an epiphytic, flowering, hemiparasitic plant of the family Loranthaceae native to Australia and found in Western Australia, the Northern Territory, Queensland and New South Wales.

== Description ==
Its inflorescence is an umbel of two or more pairs of flowers, which have rusty corollas covered with dense intertwined hairs. The fruit is globular, and the bract enlarges under the fruit. The leaves are flat.

== Ecology ==
Amyema bifurcata is found on some 22 Eucalypt species, five Angophora species, on Acacia acuminata and on Nitraria billardierei.

== Taxonomy ==
It was first described by Bentham in 1867 as Loranthus bifurcatus, with its genus being changed to Amyema by Tieghem in 1894.
