= Amyema lisae =

Scientific classification
- Kingdom: Plantae
- Clade: Tracheophytes
- Clade: Angiosperms
- Clade: Eudicots
- Order: Santalales
- Family: Loranthaceae
- Genus: Amyema
- Species: A. lisae

Binomial name
- Amyema lisae Pelser & Barcelona

Species of mistletoe

Amyema lisae, is a species of flowering plant, an epiphytic hemiparasitic plant of the family Loranthaceae first discovered in 2017 at Balinsasayao - Twin Lakes Natural Park, in the island of Negros, Philippines. Amyema lisae differs due with verticillate arrangements of leaves and simple umbels in the inflorescences. Its leaves are also relatively smaller leaves. The 5-merous flowers are tomentose and yellow, making it the only mistletoe species in the Philippines to have a yellow flower.

== Etymology ==
The species was named after Lisa J. Paguntalan, executive director Philippine Biodiversity Conservation Foundation Inc. (PBCFI) to honor her contributions to nature conservation in the Philippines.
