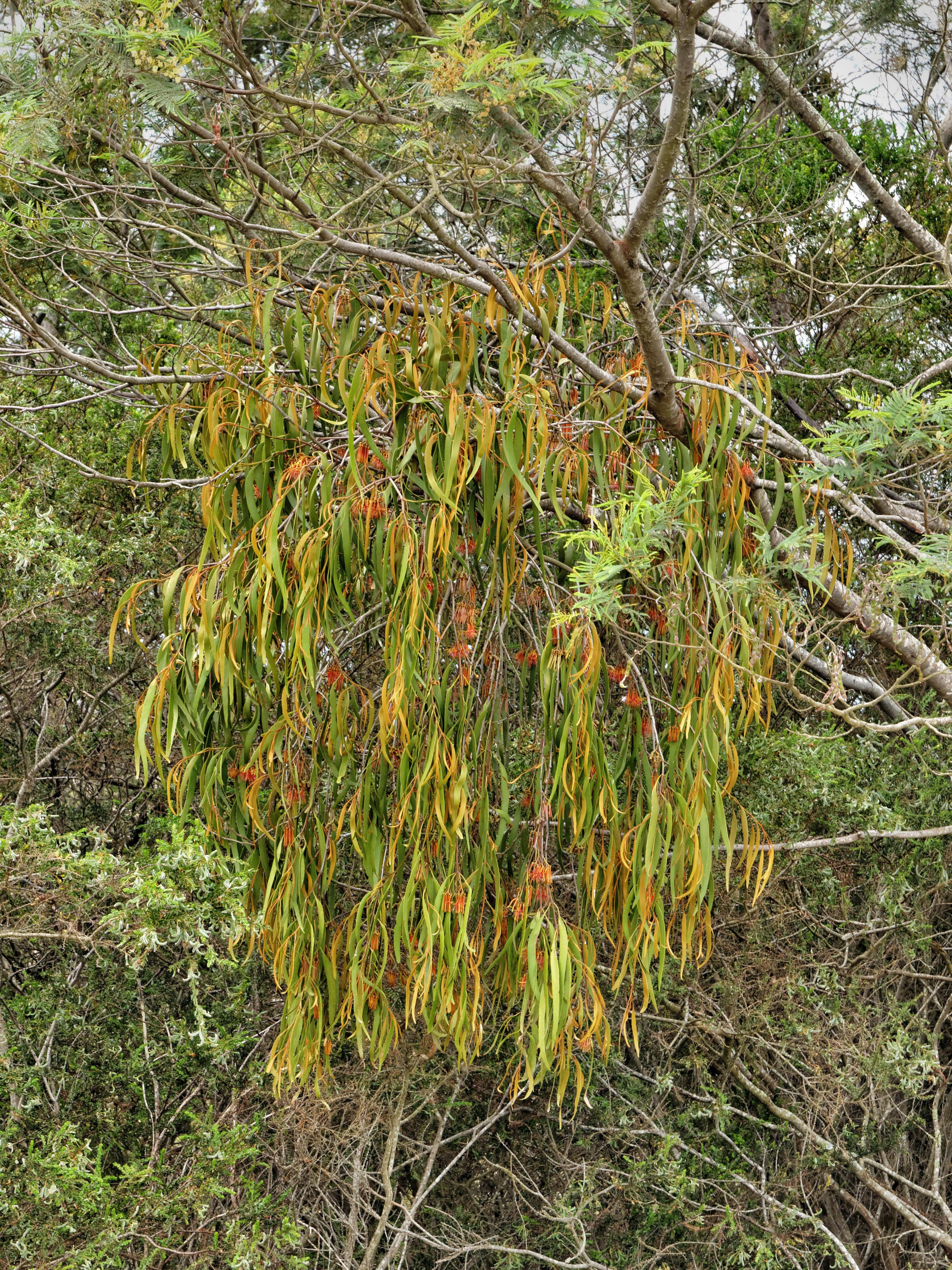
- Amyema pendula subsp. pendula on Acacia tree

Scientific classification
- Kingdom: Plantae
- Clade: Tracheophytes
- Clade: Angiosperms
- Clade: Eudicots
- Order: Santalales
- Family: Loranthaceae
- Genus: Amyema
- Species: A. pendula

Binomial name
- Amyema pendula (Sieber. ex Spreng.) Tiegh.
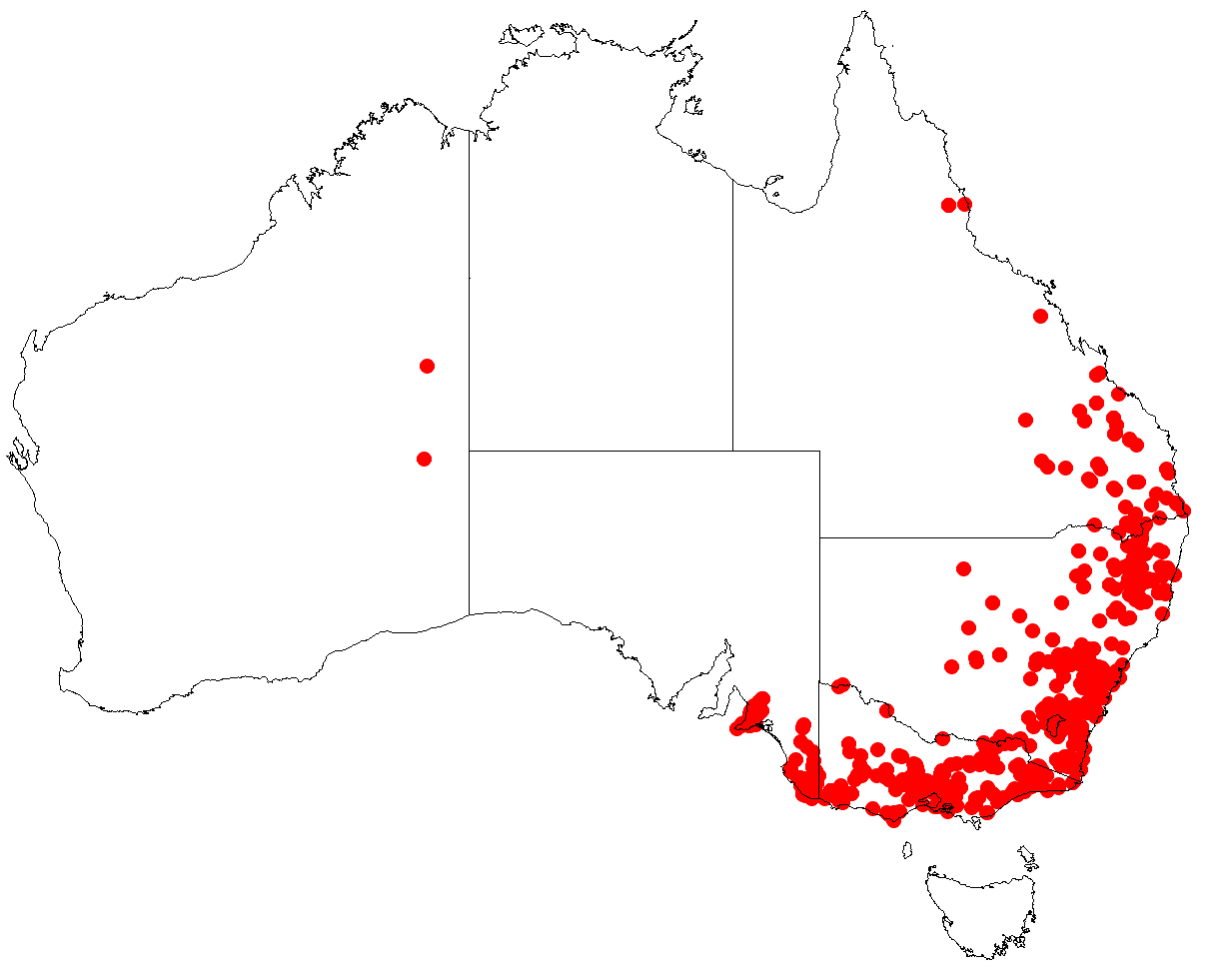
- Collections data for A. pendula from the Australasian Virtual Herbarium

= Amyema pendula =

Species of plant

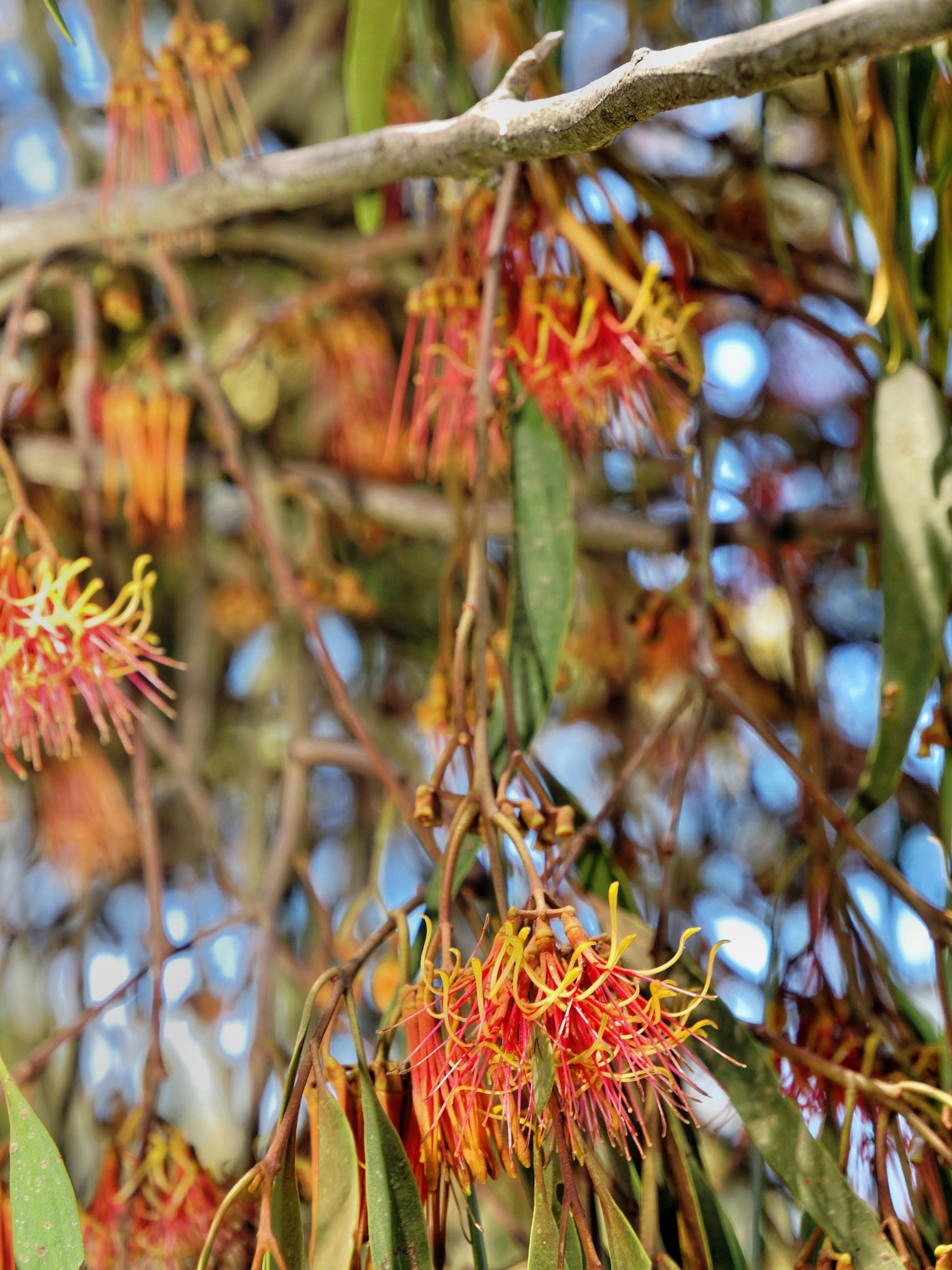
Flowers of A. pendula subsp. pendula

Amyema pendula, also known as drooping mistletoe or furry drooping mistletoe, is a species of flowering plant, an epiphytic hemiparasitic plant of the family Loranthaceae, found attached to several species of Australian eucalypt and occasionally on some species of Acacia. It is endemic to south-eastern Australia. It is the most common mistletoe in Victoria, especially on the coastal side of the Great Dividing Range. It has shiny leaves and red flowers arranged in groups of 3 or 4. It is distinguished from the similar Amyema miquelii through the lack of individual stalks on the flowers.

There are two subspecies:

- A. pendula subsp. pendula with short flower stalks and anthers to the east of the Great Dividing Range
- A. pendula subsp. longifolia with longer stalks and anthers to the west and inland.

== Taxonomy ==
Amyema pendula was first described in 1827 as Loranthum pendulus by Franz Sieber in Sprengel's Curae Posteriores. It was transferred to the genus, Amyema in 1894 by Philippe Édouard Léon Van Tieghem
