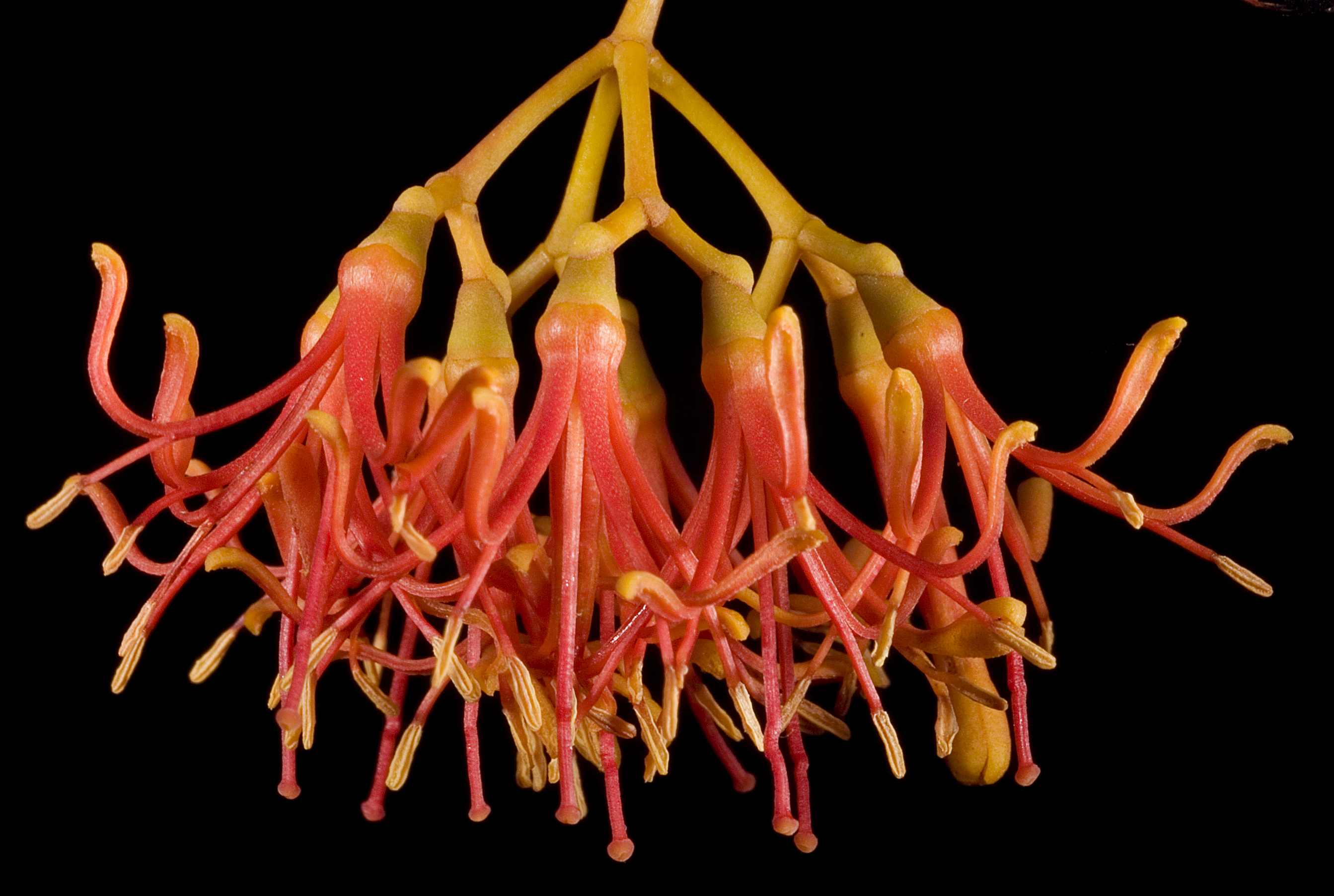
- Amyema miquelii

Scientific classification
- Kingdom: Plantae
- Clade: Tracheophytes
- Clade: Angiosperms
- Clade: Eudicots
- Order: Santalales
- Family: Loranthaceae
- Genus: Amyema
- Species: A. miquelii

Binomial name
- Amyema miquelii (Lehm. ex Miq.) Tiegh.
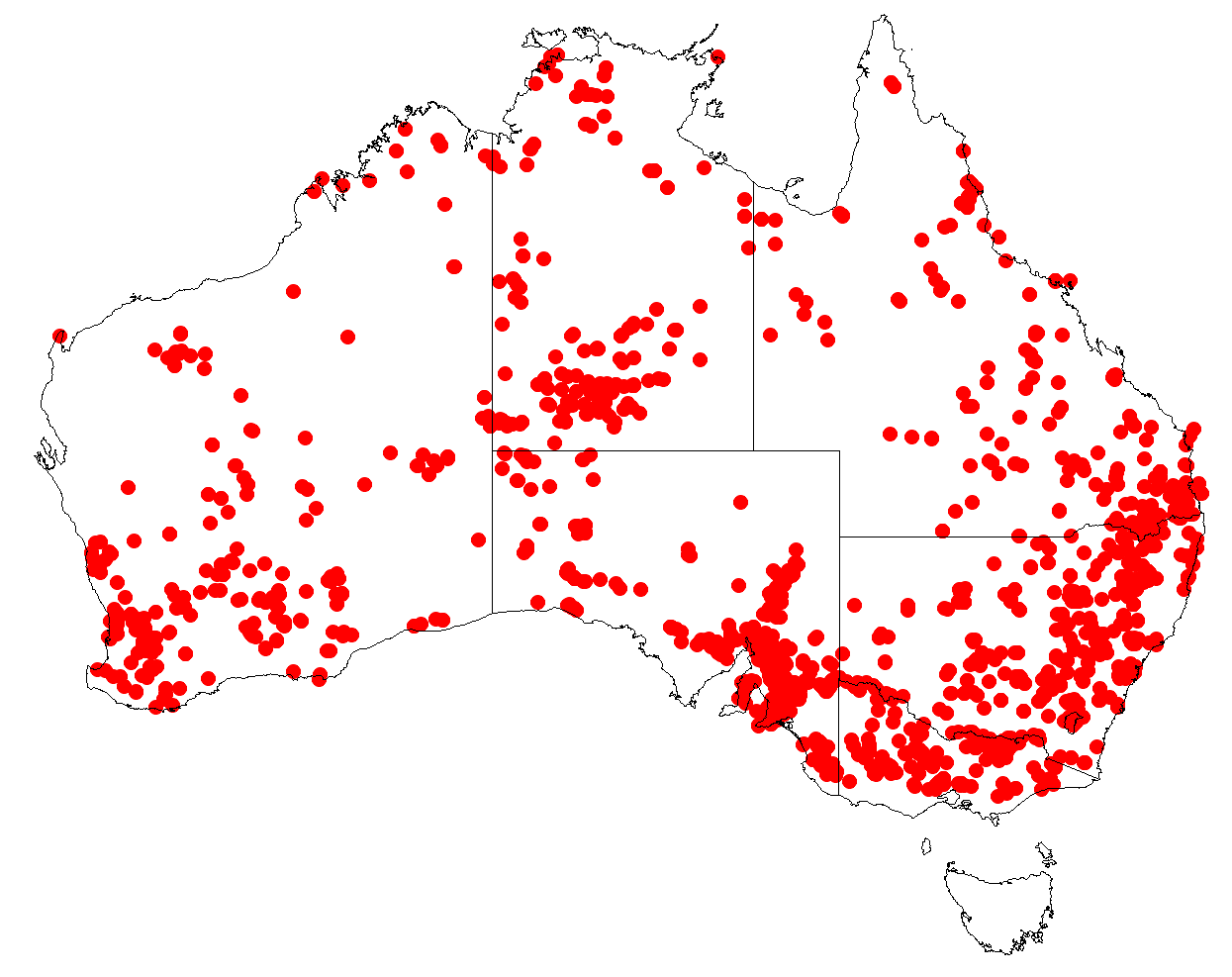
- Collections data for A. miquelii from the Australasian Virtual Herbarium

= Amyema miquelii =

Species of plant

Amyema miquelii, also known as box mistletoe, is a species of flowering plant, an epiphytic hemiparasitic plant of the family Loranthaceae, found attached to several species of Australian eucalypt and occasionally on some species of Acacia. It is the most widespread of the Australian Mistletoes, occurring mainly to the west of the Great Dividing Range. It has shiny leaves and red flowers arranged in groups of 3. It is distinguished from the similar Amyema pendula through the individual stalks of the flowers.

The seeds are dispersed by various birds, particularly by the mistletoebird (Dicaeum hirundinaceum) that eat the fruit and then either wipes the sticky remains from the beak or when defecating has to wipe it from its feathers onto, most often, a twig due to the extremely sticky nature of the seed.

The seed immediately begins to germinate and soon penetrates the vascular system of the tree and creates a physiological connection with the xylem of the new host. From that point, the seedling begins to obtain water and mineral nutrients from the host.

== Taxonomy ==
It was first described as Loranthus miqueli in 1845 by Johann Georg Christian Lehmann, was transferred to the genus, Amyema in 1894 by Philippe Édouard Léon Van Tieghem.

== Gallery ==
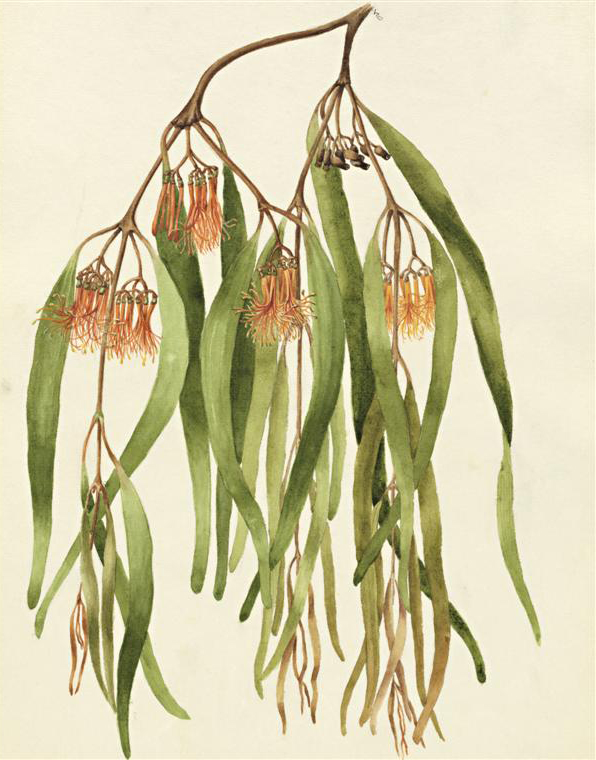

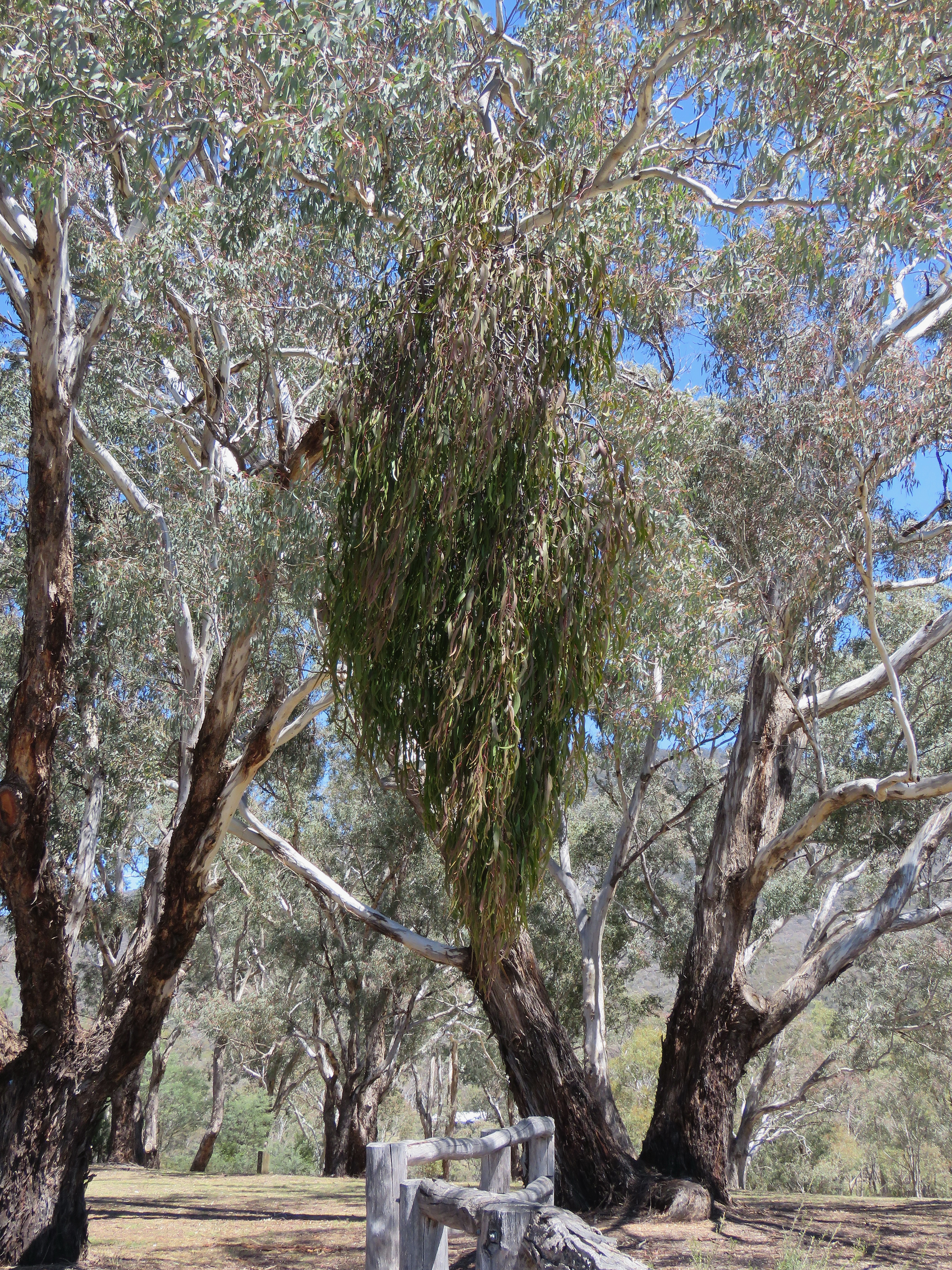

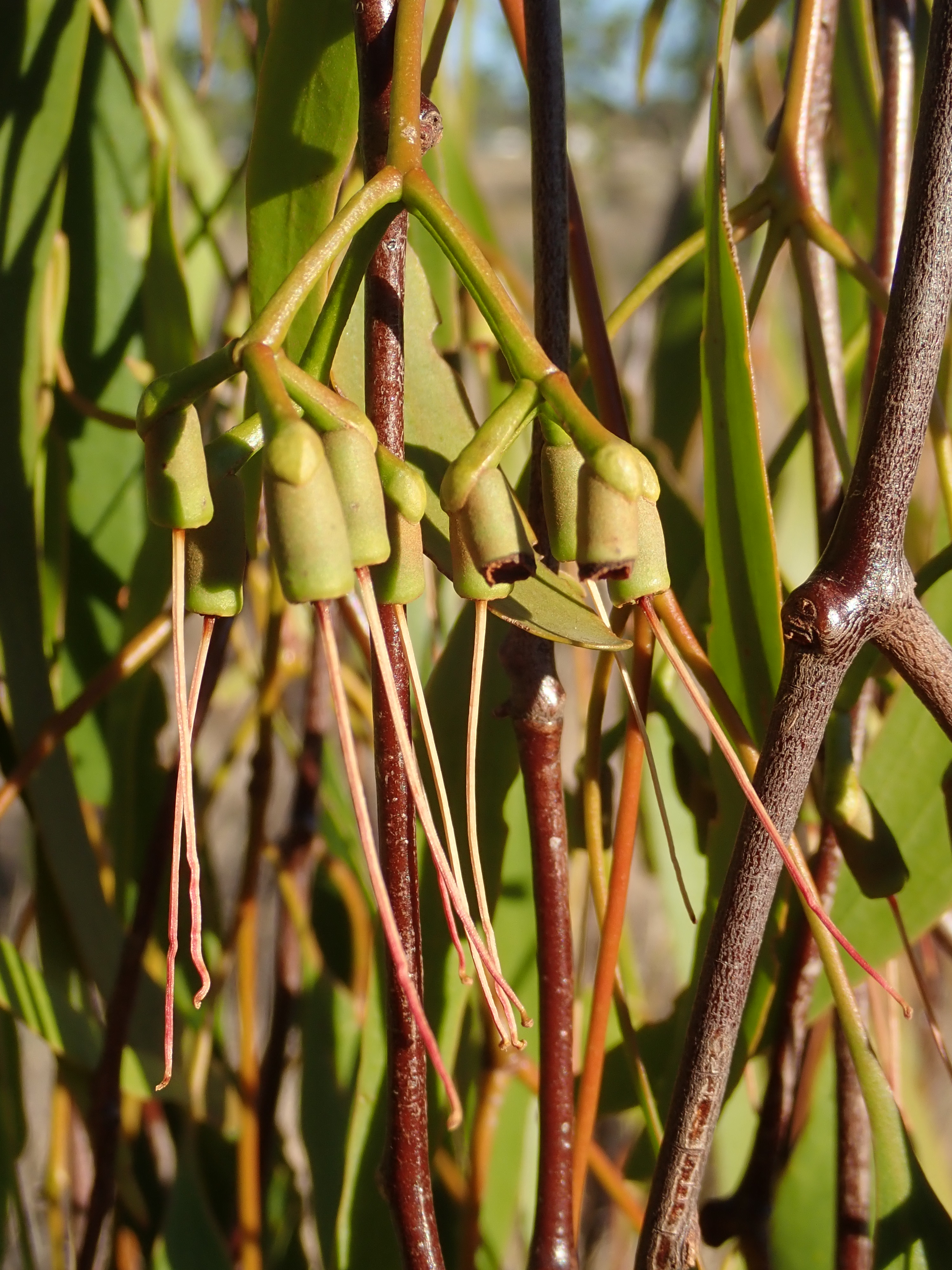
