= Bryan Alwyn Barlow =

Australian botanist (born 1933)

- Born: 1933 (age 92–93)
- Education: BSc, PhD University of Sydney 1959
- Occupation: Botanist

Bryan Alwyn Barlow (born 1933) is an Australian botanist. He was a member of Committee of the "Flora of Australia" 1982–1984, and 1986–1988. He is a former director of the Australian National Herbarium (1981-1988). He authored many Myrtaceae, Loranthaceae and Viscaceae species.

== Some Publications ==
=== Books/book chapters ===
- 1986. Flora and fauna of alpine Australasia: ages and origins. Ed. Brill. 543 pp.
- 1996. 'Viscaceae' in Flore de la Nouvelle-Caledonie. ISBN 2856542034.

=== Articles ===
- Barlow, B.A. 1958. Heteroploid twins and apomixis in Casuarina nana Sieb. Australian Journal of Botany 6, 204–219. doi:10.1071/BT9580204
- Barlow, B.A. 1959.Cytological studies in the genus Casuarina. 206 pp. (Doctoral dissertation, University of Sydney_
- Barlow, B.A. 1966. A revision of the Loranthaceae of Australia and New Zealand. Australian Journal of Botany 14, 421–499. doi:10.1071/BT9660421
- Barlow, B.A. 1971. Cytogeography of the genus Eremophila. Australian Journal of Botany 19, 295–310. doi:10.1071/BT9710295
- Barlow, B.A. & Delbert Wiens 1971. The Cytogeography of the Loranthaceous mistletoes. Taxon 20, 291–312. doi:10.2307/1218882
- Barlow, B.A. & Delbert Wiens 1973. The classification of the generic segregates of Phrygilanthus (= Notanthera) of the Loranthaceae. Brittonia 25, 26. doi:10.2307/2805488
- Barlow, B.A. 1974. A revision of the Loranthaceae of New Guinea and the south-western Pacific. Australian Journal of Botany 22, 531–621. doi:10.1071/BT9740531
- Barlow, B.A. 1977. Host-parasite Resemblance in Australian Mistletoes: The Case for Cryptic Mimicry. Evolution 31, 69–84. doi:10.1111/j.1558-5646.1977.tb00983.x
- Barlow, B.A. 1981. The Australian Flora: its origin and evolution. In Flora of Australia Ed. George, A.S. pp. 25–75. Canberra, AGPS.
- Barlow, B.A. 1983a. A revision of the genus Notothixos (Viscaceae). Brunonia 6, 1–24. doi:10.1071/BRU9830001
- Barlow, B.A. 1983b. A revision of the Viscaceae of Australia. Brunonia 6, 25–57. doi:10.1071/BRU9830025
- Barlow, B.A. 1990. Biogeographical relationships of Australia and Malesia: Loranthaceae as a model. In "The Plant Diversity of Malesia: Proceedings of the Flora Malesiana Symposium commemorating Professor Dr. C. G. G. J. van Steenis Leiden, August 1989." (Eds Pieter Baas, Cornelis Kalkman & Geesink, R.) pp. 273–292. doi:10.1007/978-94-009-2107-8_22
- Barlow, B.A. 1994. Phytogeography of the Australian region. In "Australian Vegetation", CUP, Cambridge. Ed Groves, R.H., pp. 3–35.
- Barlow, B.A. 1997. Viscaceae. Flora Malesiana 403-442.
- Barlow, B.A. 1997. Loranthaceae Flora Malesiana 209-401

== See also ==
- Category:Taxa named by Bryan Alwyn Barlow
