= Benedictus Hubertus Danser =

Dutch taxonomist and botanist

Benedictus Hubertus Danser (24 May 1891, Schiedam – 18 October 1943, Groningen), often abbreviated B. H. Danser, was a Dutch taxonomist and botanist. Danser specialised in the plant families Loranthaceae, Nepenthaceae, and Polygonaceae.

In 1928, Danser published an exhaustive revision of the genus Nepenthes, recognising 65 species in "The Nepenthaceae of the Netherlands Indies". While nowadays more than 140 species of Nepenthes are known, Danser's work is still referenced by specialists in the field.

Danser died in Groningen on 18 October 1943. The genus Dansera (Fabaceae) and the species Nepenthes danseri (Nepenthaceae), Rumex danseri (Polygonaceae) and Taxillus danseriana (Loranthaceae) are named after him.

== See also ==
- Category:Taxa named by Benedictus Hubertus Danser
