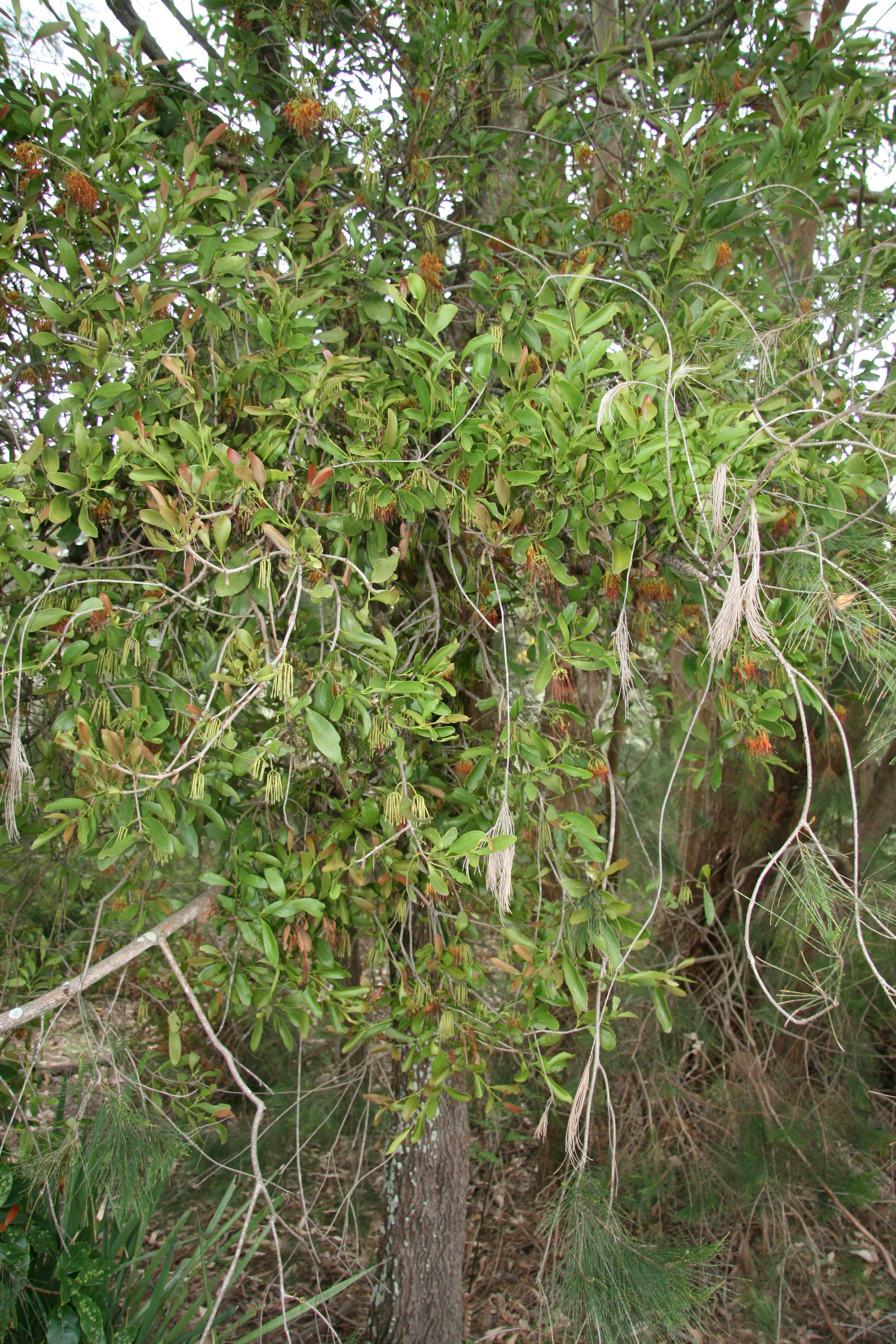

Scientific classification
- Kingdom: Plantae
- Clade: Tracheophytes
- Clade: Angiosperms
- Clade: Eudicots
- Order: Santalales
- Family: Loranthaceae
- Genus: Amyema
- Species: A. congener

Binomial name
- Amyema congener (Sieber ex Schult. & Schult.f.) Tiegh.
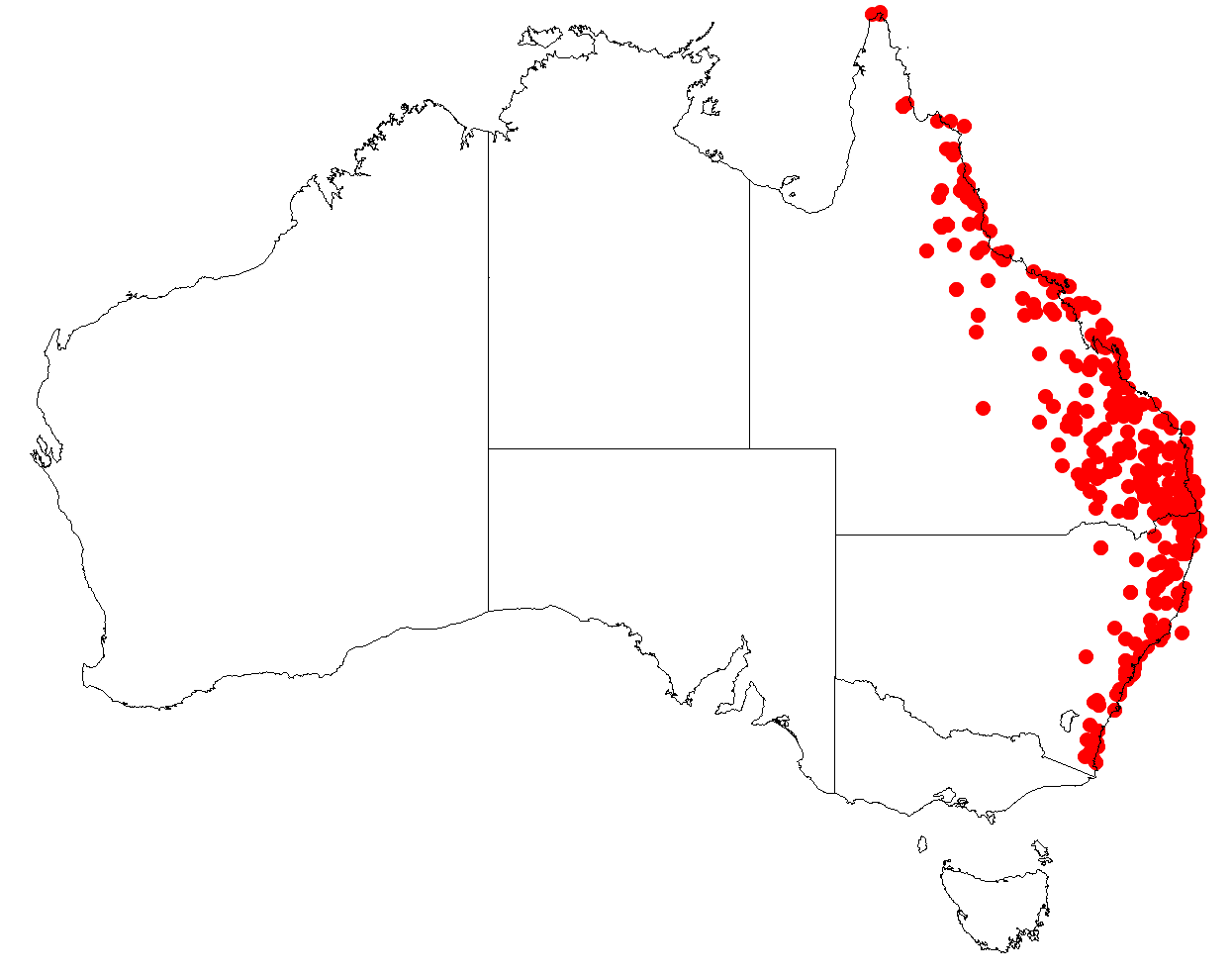
- Collections data for A. congener from the Australasian Virtual Herbarium

= Amyema congener =

Species of mistletoe

Amyema congener, commonly known as the variable mistletoe, is a species of flowering plant, an epiphytic hemiparasitic plant of the family Loranthaceae from eastern Australia. It is found on members of the genera Allocasuarina, Acacia and some exotic species.

Franz Sieber first described this species as Loranthus congener in 1829, before Philippe Édouard Léon Van Tieghem gave it its current binomial name in 1894.

It grows as shrubby plant, with either an erect or pendant (drooping) habit, from a tree branch or trunk. It is attached to the host tree by a globular woody base. The stems and foliage are smooth. The thick leathery leaves are spear-shaped (lanceolate) to oval or obovate and measure 4–11 cm (1.5–4.5 in) in length and 1–5.5 cm (0.39–2.17 in) across. Flowers can be seen at any time of year. The 0.8 cm (0.31 in) diameter round fruit ripen over the summer (December to February), and the single seed within is contained in a sticky membrane.

The principal host plant of the variable mistletoe is the black sheoak (Allocasuarina littoralis) also forest oak (A. torulosa), gossamer wattle (Acacia floribunda), white feather honeymyrtle (Melaleuca decora), prickly-leaved tea tree (M. styphelioides), prickly-leaved paperbark (M. nodosa), snow-in-summer (M. linariifolia), green native cascarilla (Croton verreauxii), red olive plum (Elaeodendron australe), as well as introduced trees such as peach and plum trees, pear trees, and oleander (Nerium oleander). It is only occasionally on gum trees such as Eucalyptus obtusifolia and smooth-barked apple Angophora costata.

The mistletoebird (Dicaeum hirundinaceum) eats the fruit.

Scale insect species such as Ceroplastes cerciferus, C. rubens, and Aspidiotus aurantii can attack the plant.

The seed immediately begins to germinate and soon penetrates the vascular system of the tree and creates a physiological connection with the xylem of the new host. From that point, the seedling begins to obtain water and mineral nutrients from the host.
