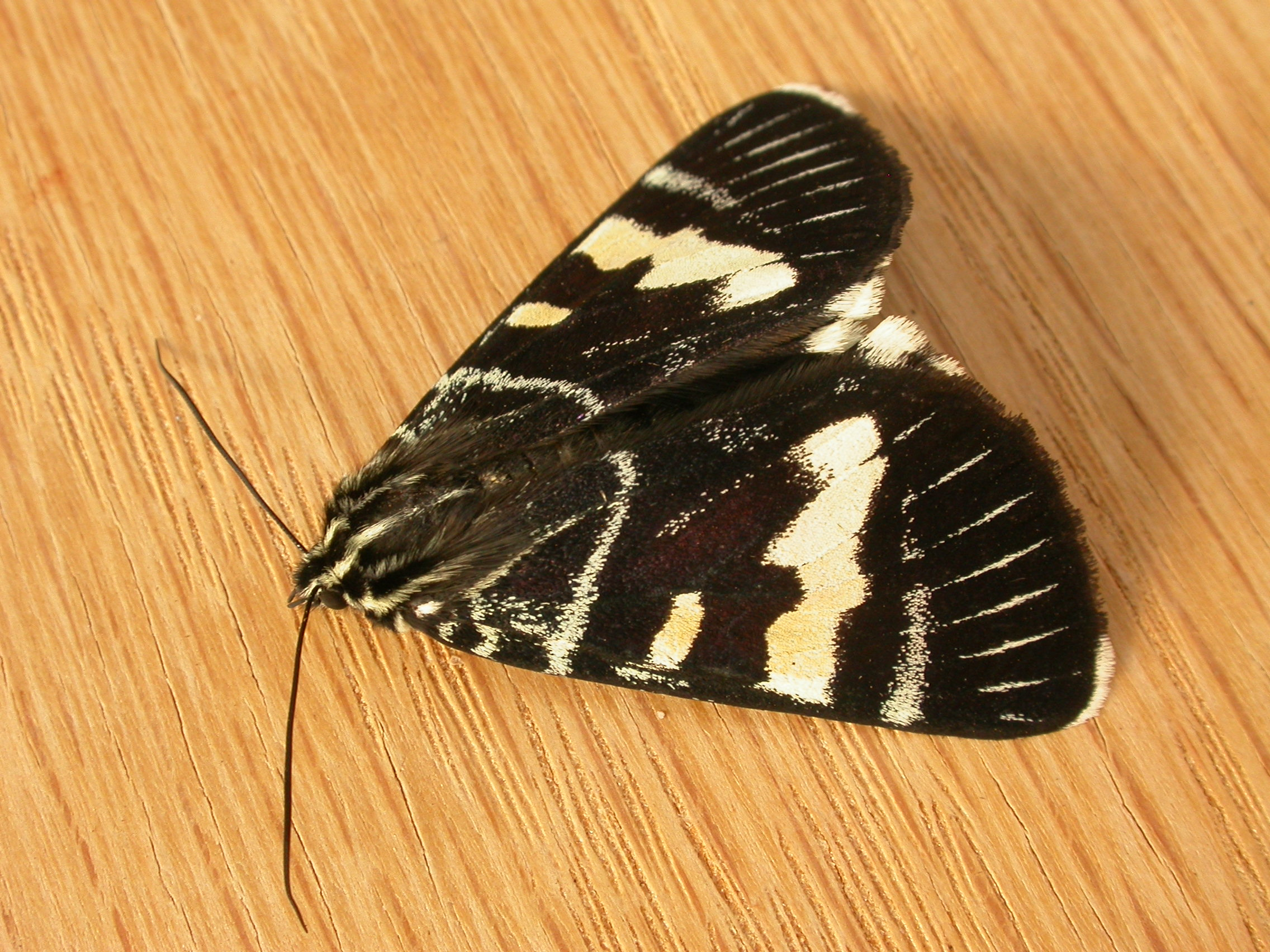

Scientific classification
- Kingdom: Animalia
- Phylum: Arthropoda
- Clade: Pancrustacea
- Class: Insecta
- Order: Lepidoptera
- Superfamily: Noctuoidea
- Family: Noctuidae
- Genus: Phalaenoides
- Species: P. glycinae

Binomial name
- Phalaenoides glycinae Lewin, 1805

Synonyms
- Phoelenoides glycine

= Phalaenoides glycinae =

Australian grapevine moth

Species of moth

Phalaenoides glycinae, the Australian grapevine moth, is a moth of the family Noctuidae that is native to southeastern Australia. The species was first described by John Lewin in 1805.

== Description ==
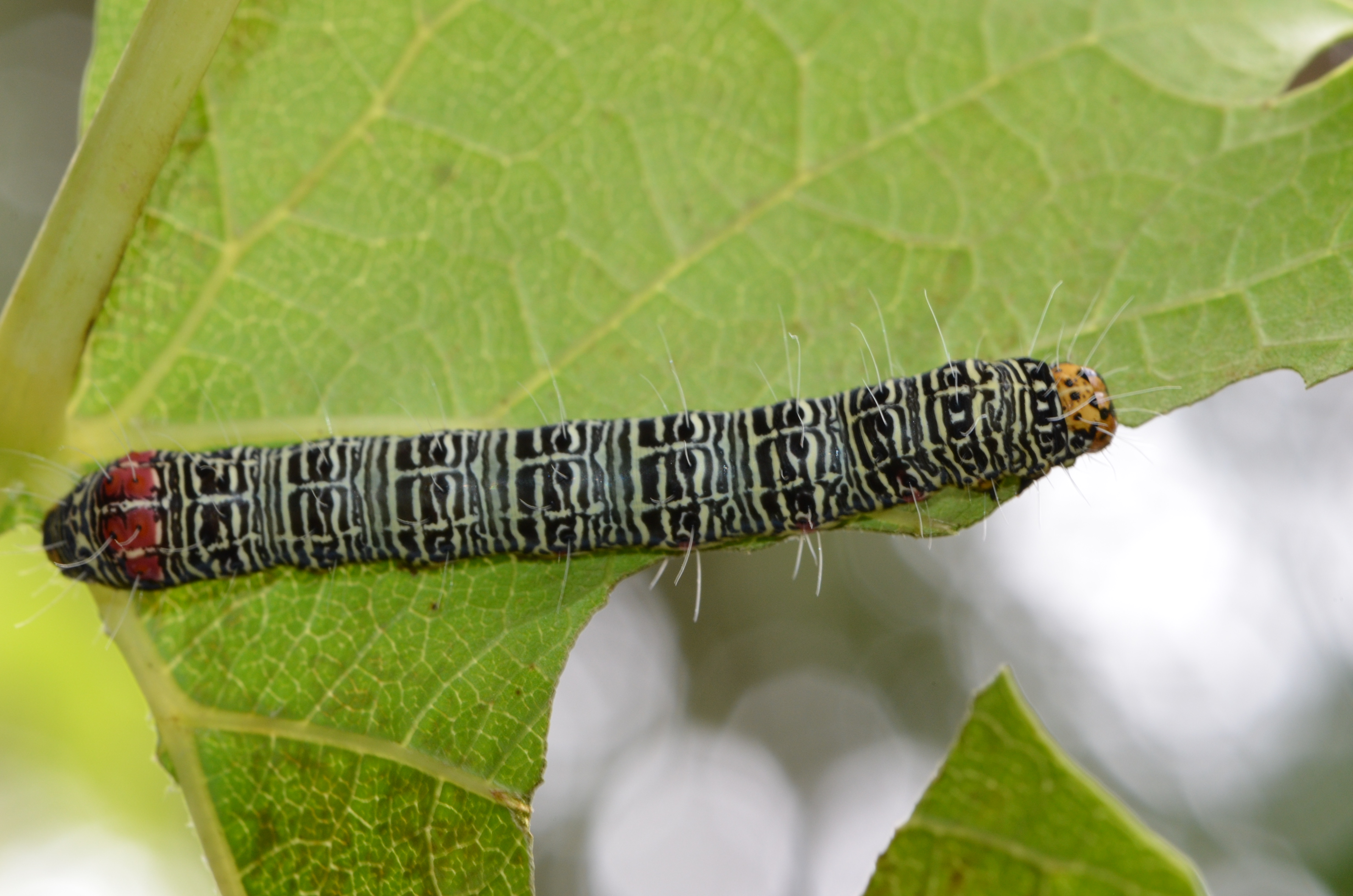
Caterpillar stage

As a caterpillar, it is black with pale yellow lines that run across the body, giving it a chequered look. It has long white hairs thinly distributed over its soft skin, a light brown head capsule, red spots around the head area, and a prominent red croup. The caterpillar usually rests on the undersurface of the leaves that it feeds on.

The adult is a diurnal flying moth with a black wingspan of up to 5 cm having white bands on the forewings and a white outer margin on the hindwings. The abdomen is black on the top with orange bands below. The body features clumps of bright red hair on the end of the abdomen, and at the legs base. These red hairs protrude and are visible from atop.

The adult males have anterior brush organs which exude pheromones. The adults are social, feeding on nectar and live for around 2-3 weeks. The moth can ascend over 25 meters.

== Distribution ==
It is endemic to the south-eastern half of Australia, but is an invasive species in many parts of the world, including New Zealand, Canada and South Africa.

== Diet ==
The larvae mainly feed on Parthenocissus quinquefolia, Hibbertia obtusifolia, Amyema gaudichaudii, Epilobium ciliatum, Fuchsia and Oenothera species, but mainly Vitis vinifera, hence it is considered an agricultural pest.

== Pest control ==
The Indian myna (Acridotheres tristis) was introduced into Australia in 1862 to deal with a number of insect pests including the grapevine moth. In this it was unsuccessful, and ironically the bird is now itself considered a pest in many parts of Australia.

== Gallery ==
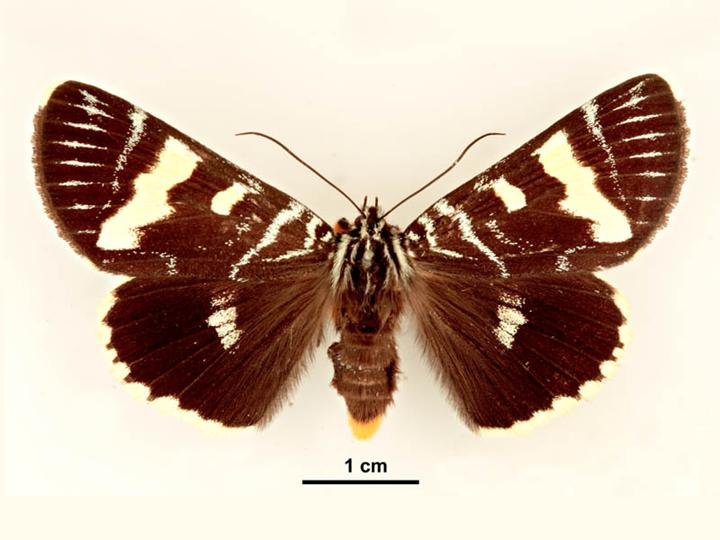
Female, dorsal view

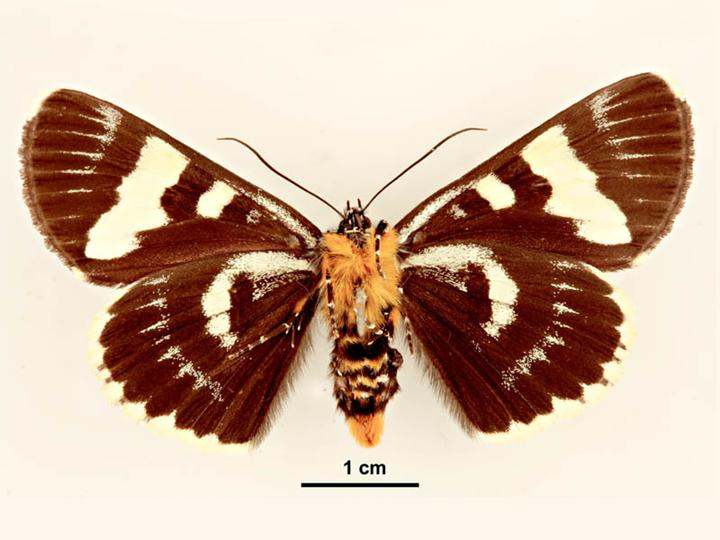
Female, ventral view

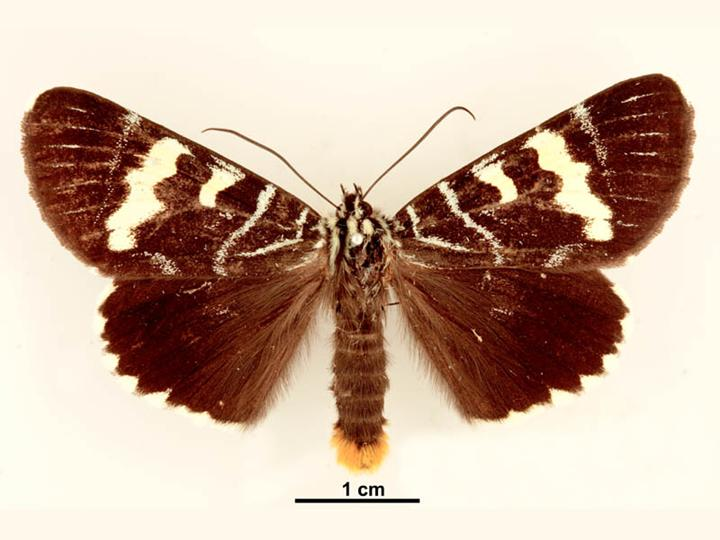
Male, dorsal view

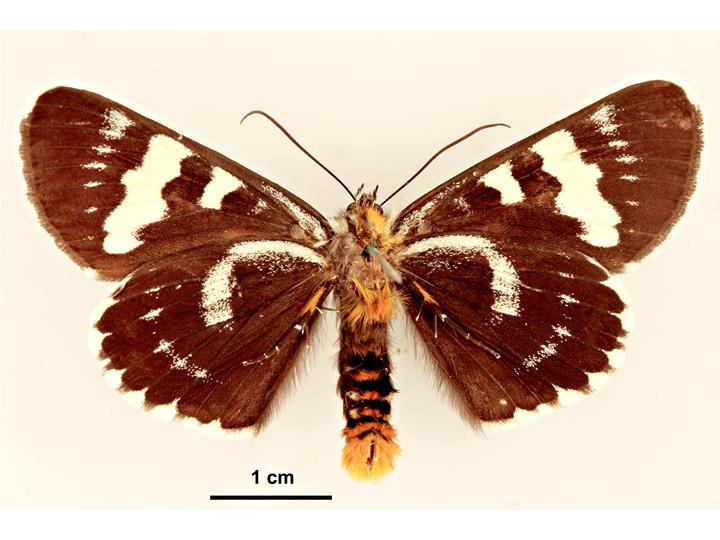
Male, ventral view

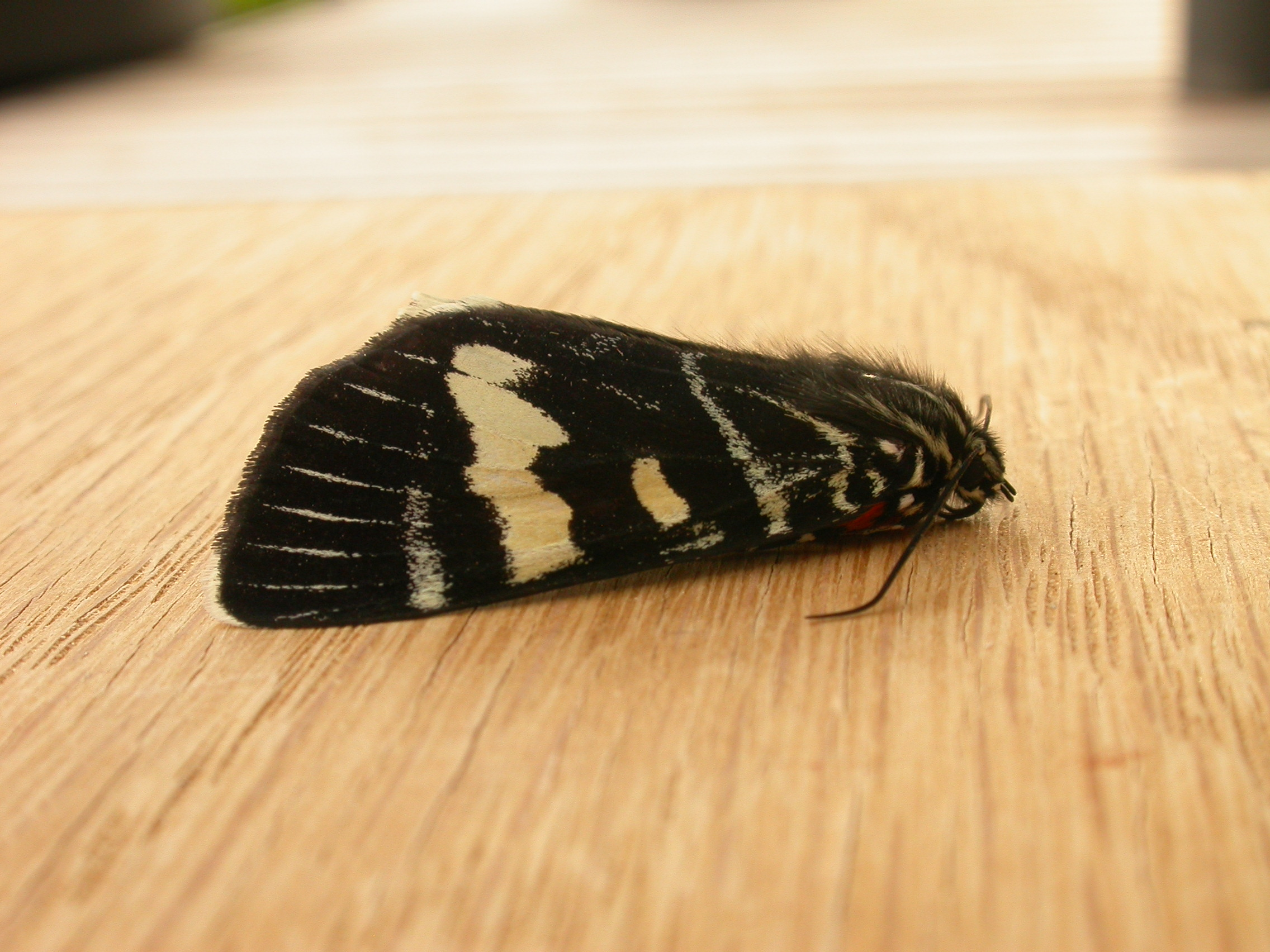
Side view

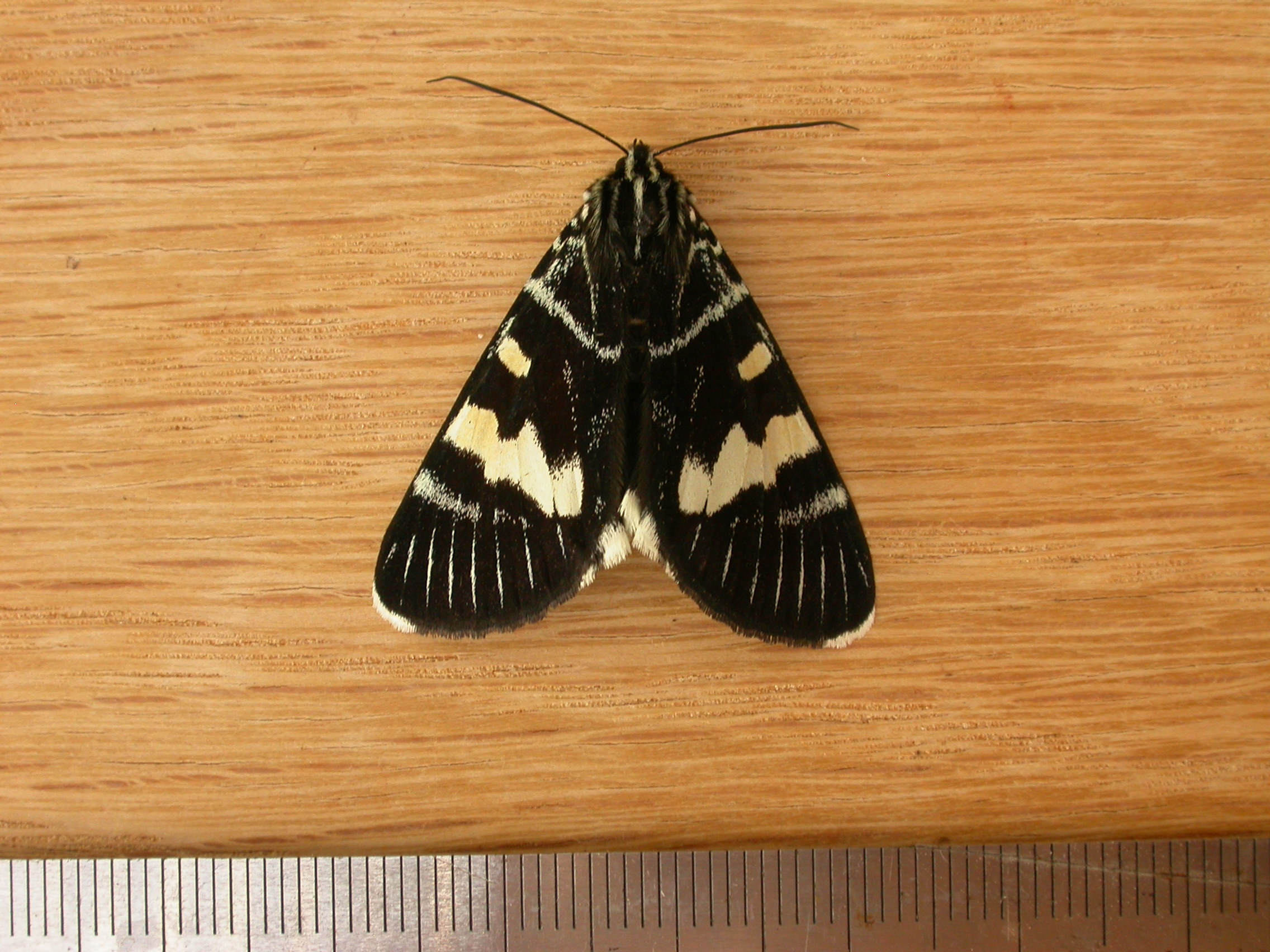
Aerial view

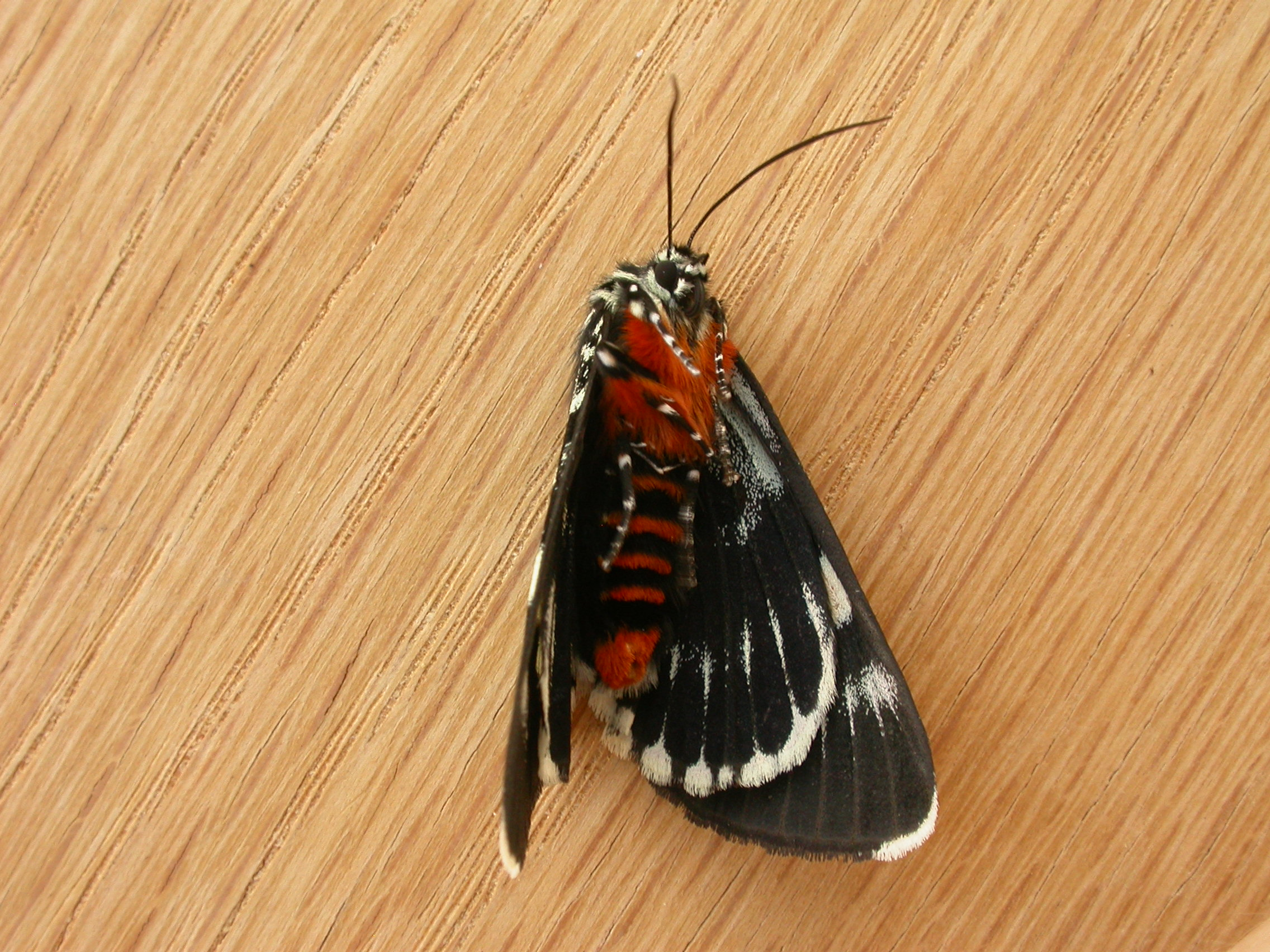
Thorax

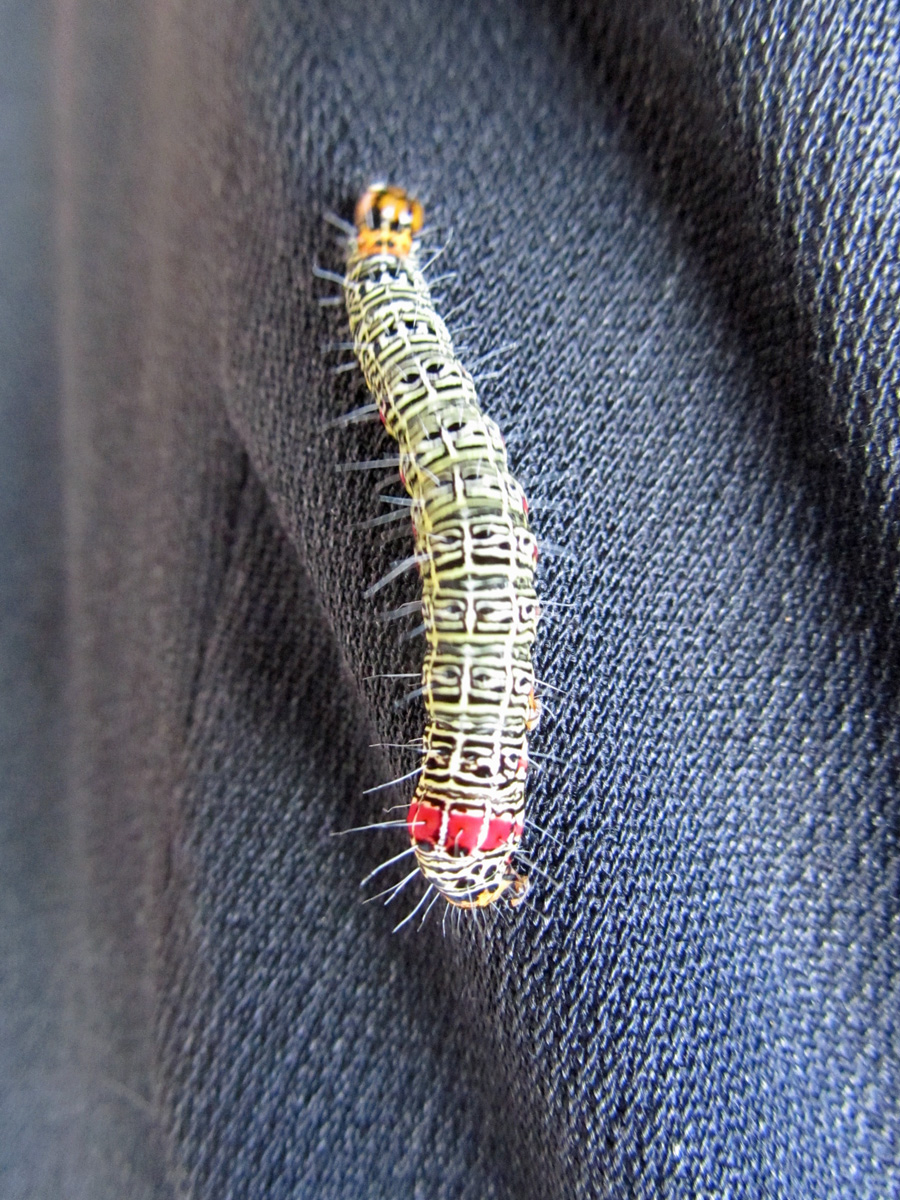
Caterpillar
