= Pilostibes basivitta =

Scientific classification
- Kingdom: Animalia
- Phylum: Arthropoda
- Class: Insecta
- Order: Lepidoptera
- Family: Xyloryctidae
- Genus: Pilostibes
- Species: P. basivitta

Binomial name
- Pilostibes basivitta (Walker, 1864)

Synonyms
- Marisba basivitta Walker, 1864; Pilostibes enchidias Meyrick, 1890

Species of moth

Pilostibes basivitta is a moth in the family Xyloryctidae. It was described by Francis Walker in 1864. It is found in Australia, where it has been recorded from New South Wales and Queensland.

The wingspan is about 32 mm. The forewings are whitish ochreous with a strong fuscous longitudinal streak, mixed with blackish, from the base below the costa to the disc before the middle, with two short oblique teeth from its upper edge, and its apex connected by a short line with an oblique linear blackish dot in the disc beyond the middle. There is a short blackish longitudinal dash beneath the apex of this streak. A fine blackish line is found on the inner margin from one-third to the anal angle. The hindwings are whitish-yellowish.

The larvae feed on Callistemon salignus and Melaleuca nodosa. They bore in the stem of their host plant, tying cut leaves to the bore entrance.
