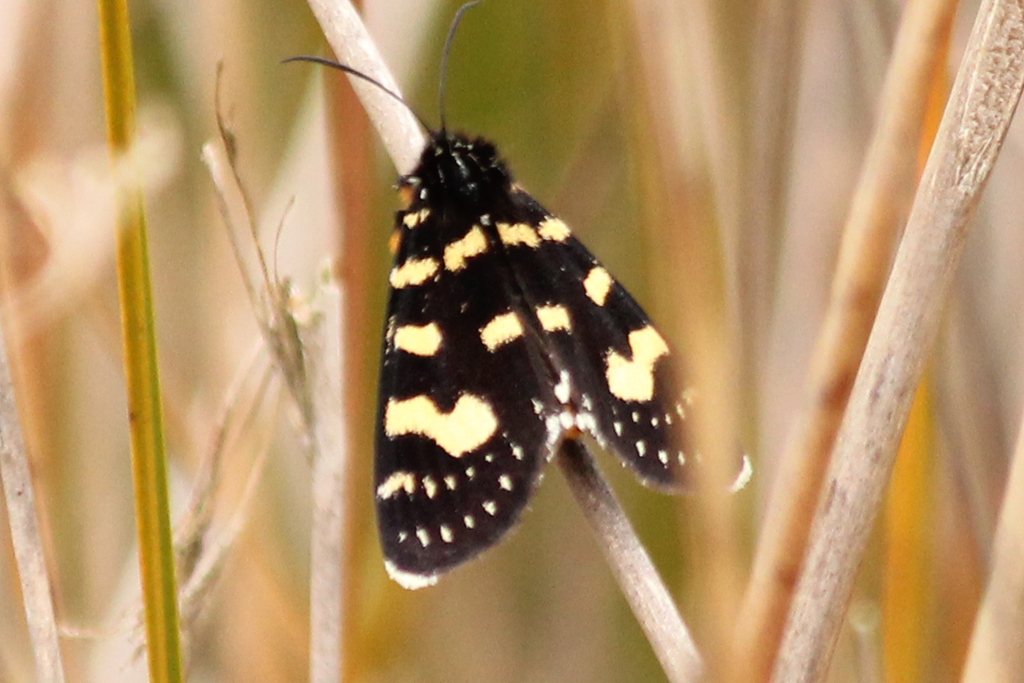

Scientific classification
- Kingdom: Animalia
- Phylum: Arthropoda
- Class: Insecta
- Order: Lepidoptera
- Superfamily: Noctuoidea
- Family: Noctuidae
- Genus: Phalaenoides
- Species: P. tristifica

Binomial name
- Phalaenoides tristifica Hübner, 1818

Synonyms
- Eutactis tristifica _{Hübner, 1818}; Agarista lewinii _{Boisduval, 1832}; Agarista ephyra _{Angas, 1847}

= Phalaenoides tristifica =

Willow-herb day-moth

Species of moth

Phalaenoides tristifica, the willow-herb day, is a moth of the family Noctuidae that is native to southeastern Australia. The species was first described by Jacob Hübner in 1818.

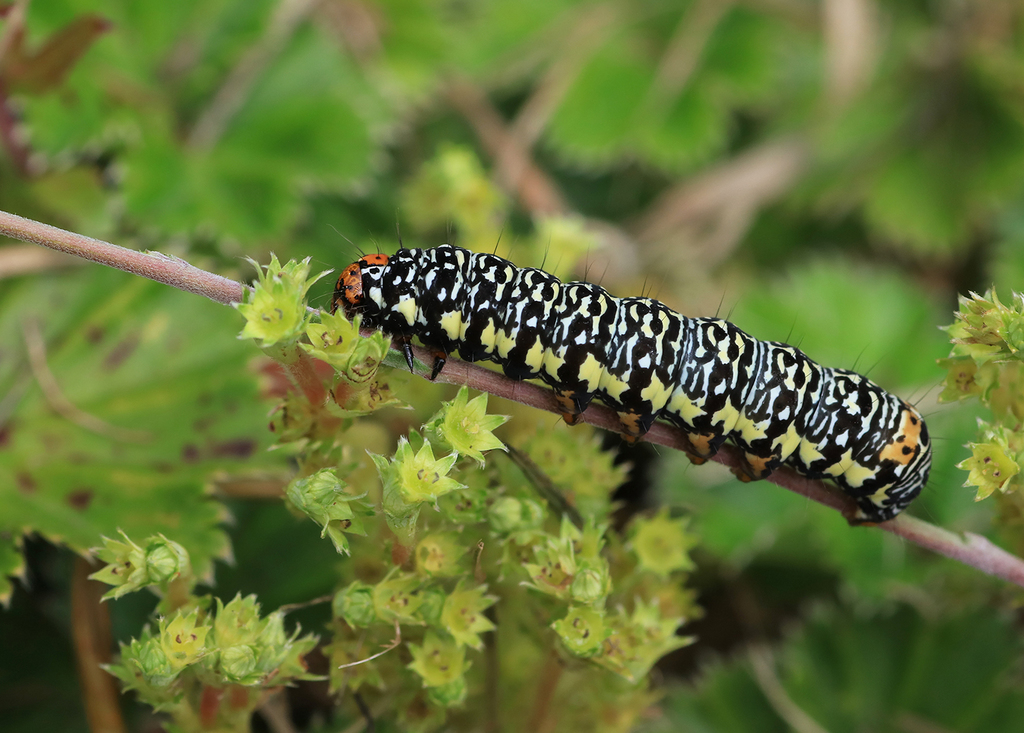
Larvae stage
