= Pilostibes embroneta =

Scientific classification
- Domain: Eukaryota
- Kingdom: Animalia
- Phylum: Arthropoda
- Class: Insecta
- Order: Lepidoptera
- Family: Xyloryctidae
- Genus: Pilostibes
- Species: P. embroneta

Binomial name
- Pilostibes embroneta Turner, 1902

Species of moth

Pilostibes embroneta is a moth in the family Xyloryctidae. It was described by Alfred Jefferis Turner in 1902. It is found in Australia, where it has been recorded from Queensland.

The wingspan is 30–46 mm. The forewings are pale brown, with a very few scattered dark fuscous scales and a broad streak from the base of the costa to beyond the middle of the disc, toothed above at one-third and beneath at two-thirds, white, edged with dark fuscous, the apical third narrow and wholly dark fuscous. The hindwings are whitish, slightly brownish-tinged.

The larvae feed on Callistemon species. They bore in the stem of their host plant.
