= Pilostibes =

Scientific classification
- Domain: Eukaryota
- Kingdom: Animalia
- Phylum: Arthropoda
- Class: Insecta
- Order: Lepidoptera
- Family: Xyloryctidae
- Genus: Pilostibes; Meyrick, 1890

Synonyms
- Marisba Walker, 1864 (preocc. Walker, 1863)

Moth genus in family Xyloryctidae

Pilostibes is a genus of moths of the family Xyloryctidae.

== Species ==
- Pilostibes basivitta (Walker, 1864)
- Pilostibes embroneta Turner, 1902
- Pilostibes serpta Lucas, 1901
- Pilostibes stigmatias Meyrick, 1890
