= Pilostibes stigmatias =

Scientific classification
- Kingdom: Animalia
- Phylum: Arthropoda
- Class: Insecta
- Order: Lepidoptera
- Family: Xyloryctidae
- Genus: Pilostibes
- Species: P. stigmatias

Binomial name
- Pilostibes stigmatias Meyrick, 1890

Species of moth

Pilostibes stigmatias is a moth in the family Xyloryctidae. It was described by Edward Meyrick in 1890. It is found in Australia, where it has been recorded from New South Wales and Queensland.

The wingspan is 44–46 mm. The forewings are pale brownish ochreous irrorated (sprinkled) with dark fuscous, the costal half suffused with ochreous brown and with a moderate transverse oblong-oval very dark reddish-fuscous slenderly whitish-margined central spot, the lower extremity becoming black and produced into a slender acute outwardly oblique tooth. The hindwings are fuscous, lighter towards the base and with a darker hindmarginal line.

The larvae feed on Elaeocarpus obovatus and Sloanea australis. They bore in the stem of their host plant.
