= Pilostibes serpta =

Scientific classification
- Domain: Eukaryota
- Kingdom: Animalia
- Phylum: Arthropoda
- Class: Insecta
- Order: Lepidoptera
- Family: Xyloryctidae
- Genus: Pilostibes
- Species: P. serpta

Binomial name
- Pilostibes serpta T. P. Lucas, 1901

Species of moth

Pilostibes serpta is a moth in the family Xyloryctidae. It was described by Thomas Pennington Lucas in 1901. It is found in Australia, where it has been recorded from New South Wales, Queensland, South Australia and Western Australia.

The wingspan is about 27 mm. The forewings are light ochreous fuscous, with central and marginal diffusions of darker fuscous and black or white and dark fuscous markings. There is a subcostal black line from near the base to beyond half the costa, interrupted near the base and dotted with white dots throughout. A band of ground colour suffused with bluish white separates this costal line from a median fuscous diffusion. In this darker area are two circuitous white-lined rounded figures answering to discal and orbital, the outline gently undulating in and out and containing darker fuscous toward the costa. There are white dots scattered between the figures, and a winding white line anterior to the second figure, which turns sharply, circles obliquely to just before the anal angle of the inner margin. The central fascia is attenuated to a spear-like prominence beyond the second figure. The hindwings are light fuscous, lighter toward the inner margin.
