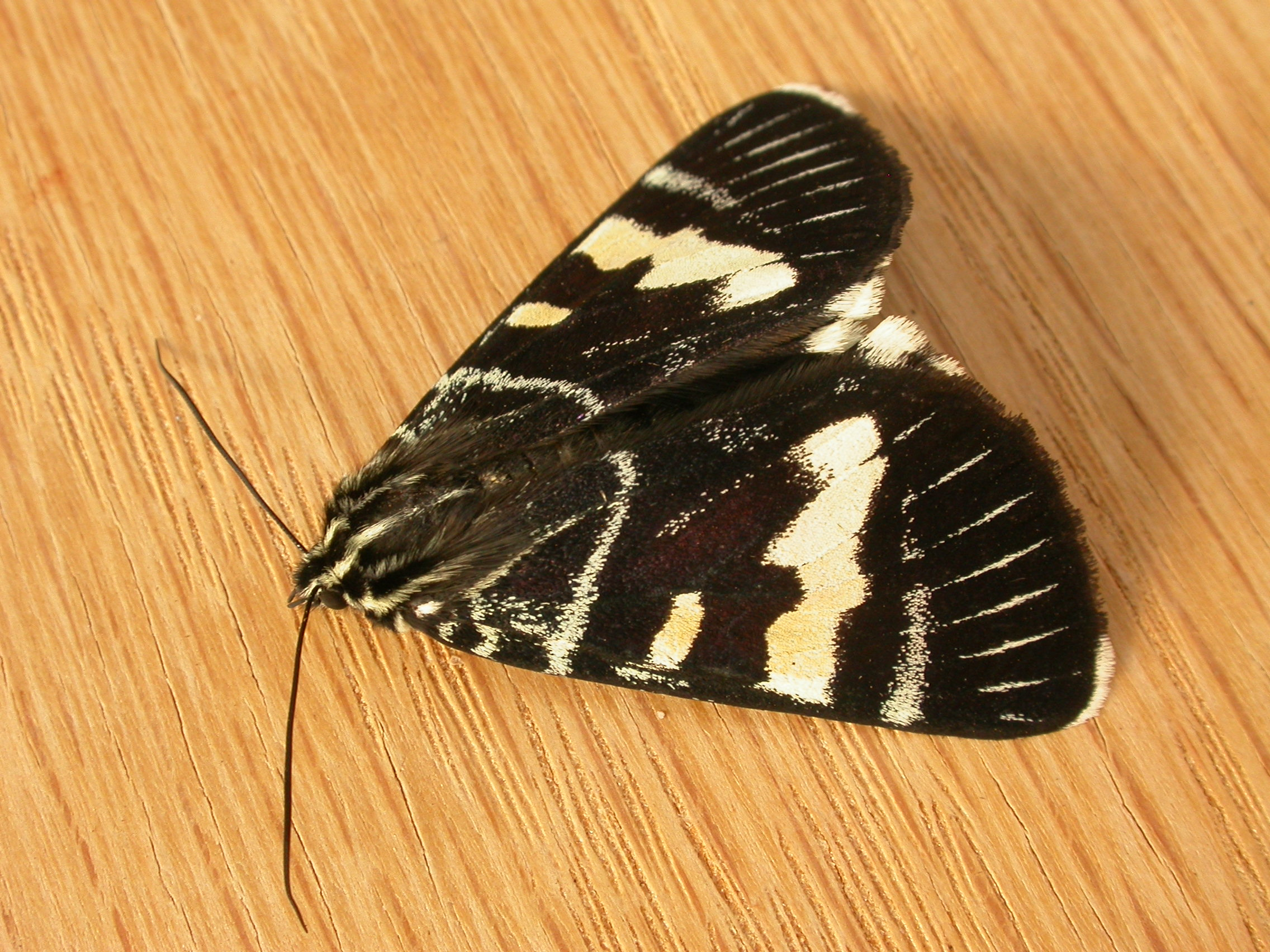
- Phalaenoides glycinae

Scientific classification
- Domain: Eukaryota
- Kingdom: Animalia
- Phylum: Arthropoda
- Class: Insecta
- Order: Lepidoptera
- Superfamily: Noctuoidea
- Family: Noctuidae
- Subfamily: Agaristinae
- Genus: Phalaenoides; Lewin, 1805

Type species
- Phalaenoides glycinae Lewin, 1805

Synonyms
- Eutactis Hübner, 1818; Phoelenoides Boisduval, 1874 (missp.); Phalenoides Pagenstecher, 1909 (missp.); Eutaetis Strand, 1912 (missp.); Phalaenodes Dugdale, 1988 (missp.)

= Phalaenoides =

Genus of moths

Phalaenoides is a genus of moths of the family Noctuidae. The genus was erected by John Lewin in 1805.

== Species ==
- Phalaenoides glycinae Lewin, 1805 – Australian grapevine moth
- Phalaenoides tristifica (Hübner, 1818)
