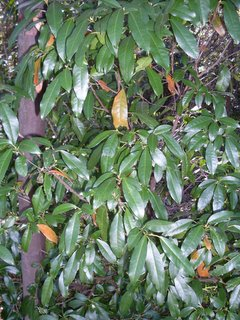
- At Eastwood, NSW

Scientific classification
- Kingdom: Plantae
- Clade: Tracheophytes
- Clade: Angiosperms
- Clade: Eudicots
- Clade: Rosids
- Order: Malpighiales
- Family: Euphorbiaceae
- Genus: Croton
- Species: C. verreauxii

Binomial name
- Croton verreauxii Baill.

= Croton verreauxii =

Green native cascarilla

Species of tree

Croton verreauxii, known as the green native cascarilla, is a small tree or shrub growing in dry rainforest and rainforest margins in eastern Australia.

The range of natural distribution is from Kiama (34° S) in the Illawarra district of eastern New South Wales to Gympie (27° S) in southeastern Queensland. Alexander Floyd mentions a recording of this species at Darwin, Northern Territory.

== Description ==
Usually a shrub on the ecotone between eucalyptus forest and rainforest. However, it can grow in rainforest and reach a height of 20 metres and a trunk diameter of 20 cm.

The trunk is short, not buttressed, and crooked. Branches form near the ground. The bark is dark brown, sometimes with thin vertical cracks. Small branches are grey and slender, with a few irregularities, such as scales and hairs. When crushed, a pleasant sweet scent may be noticed.

Leaves are alternate, blunt tipped, and tapering or rounded at the base. They are glossy green above, somewhat duller below. An occasional orange senescent leaf will be seen in the canopy. Leaves are 5 to 12 cm long, elliptic in shape, toothed or sometimes not toothed. Leaf stalks are 5 to 13 mm long, and channeled on the upper surface. At the top of the leaf stalks are two small glands.

Yellowish green flowers form on racemes from November to January. The five-petaled flowers are either male or female on the same plant. The fruit is an orange-brown capsule, with three lobes, each containing a single reddish-brown smooth, angular seed. Seed size is 2mm in diameter. Fruit matures mostly from April to September, but may occur at any other time of the year.

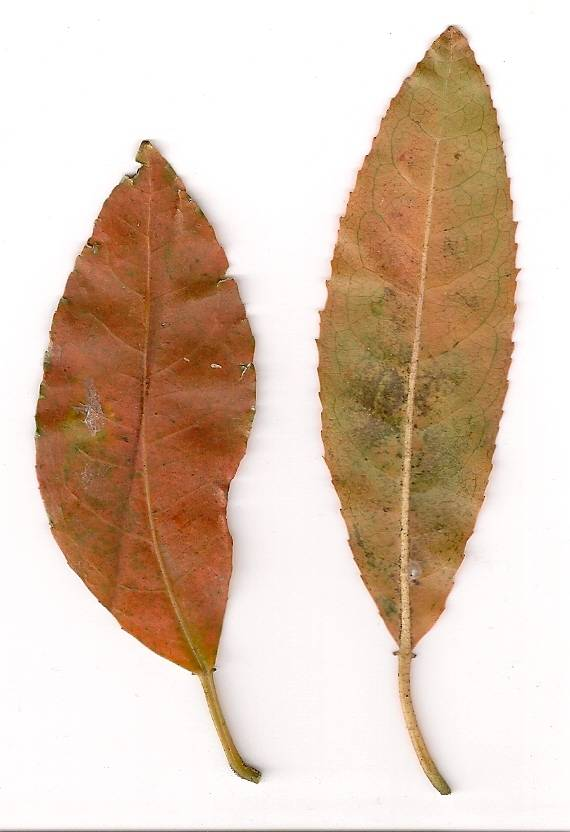
Senescent leaves of the green native cascarilla
