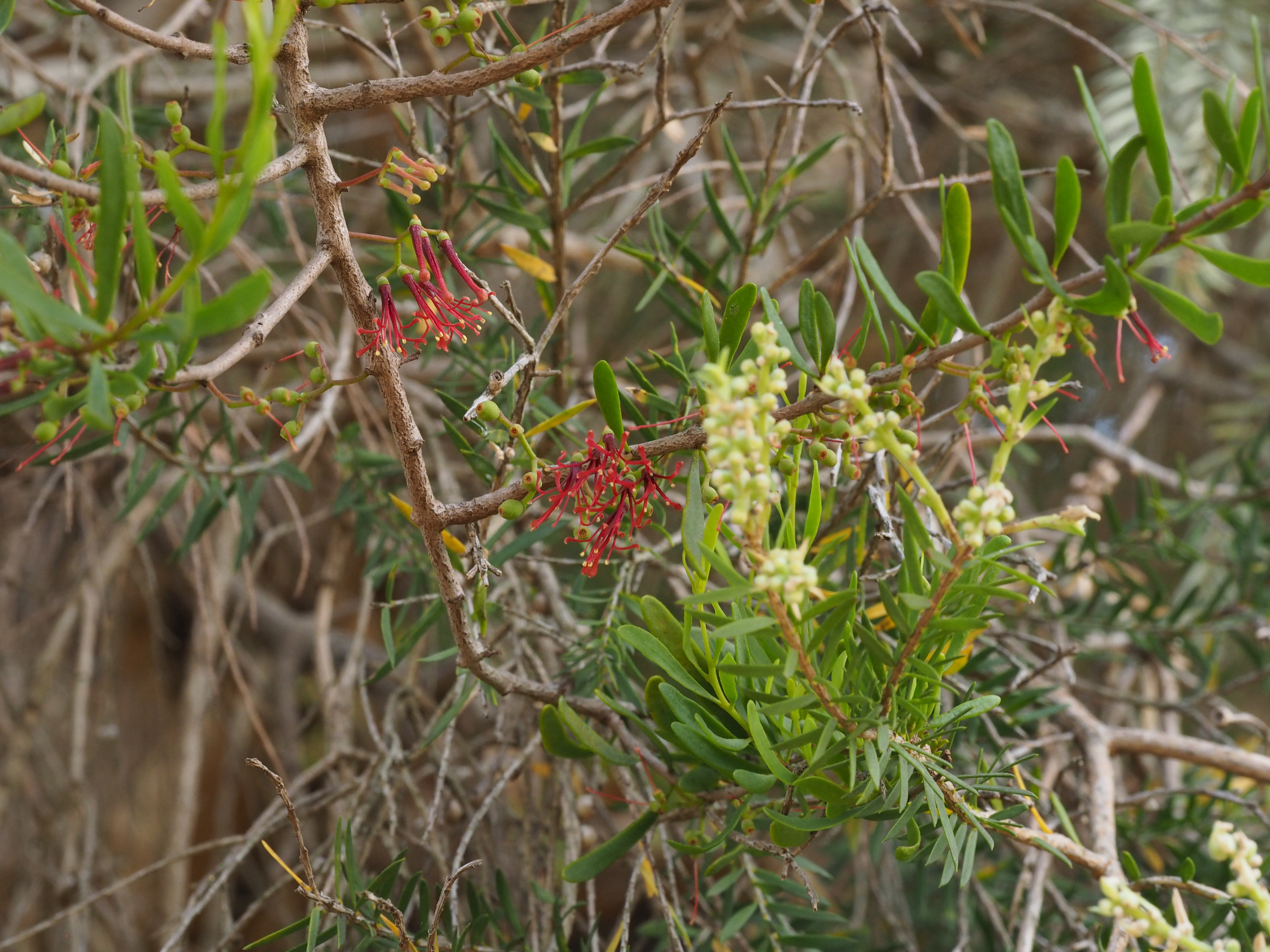
- Amyema gaudichaudii on Melaleuca decora

Scientific classification
- Kingdom: Plantae
- Clade: Embryophytes
- Clade: Tracheophytes
- Clade: Spermatophytes
- Clade: Angiosperms
- Clade: Eudicots
- Order: Santalales
- Family: Loranthaceae
- Genus: Amyema
- Species: A. gaudichaudii

Binomial name
- Amyema gaudichaudii (DC.) Tiegh.
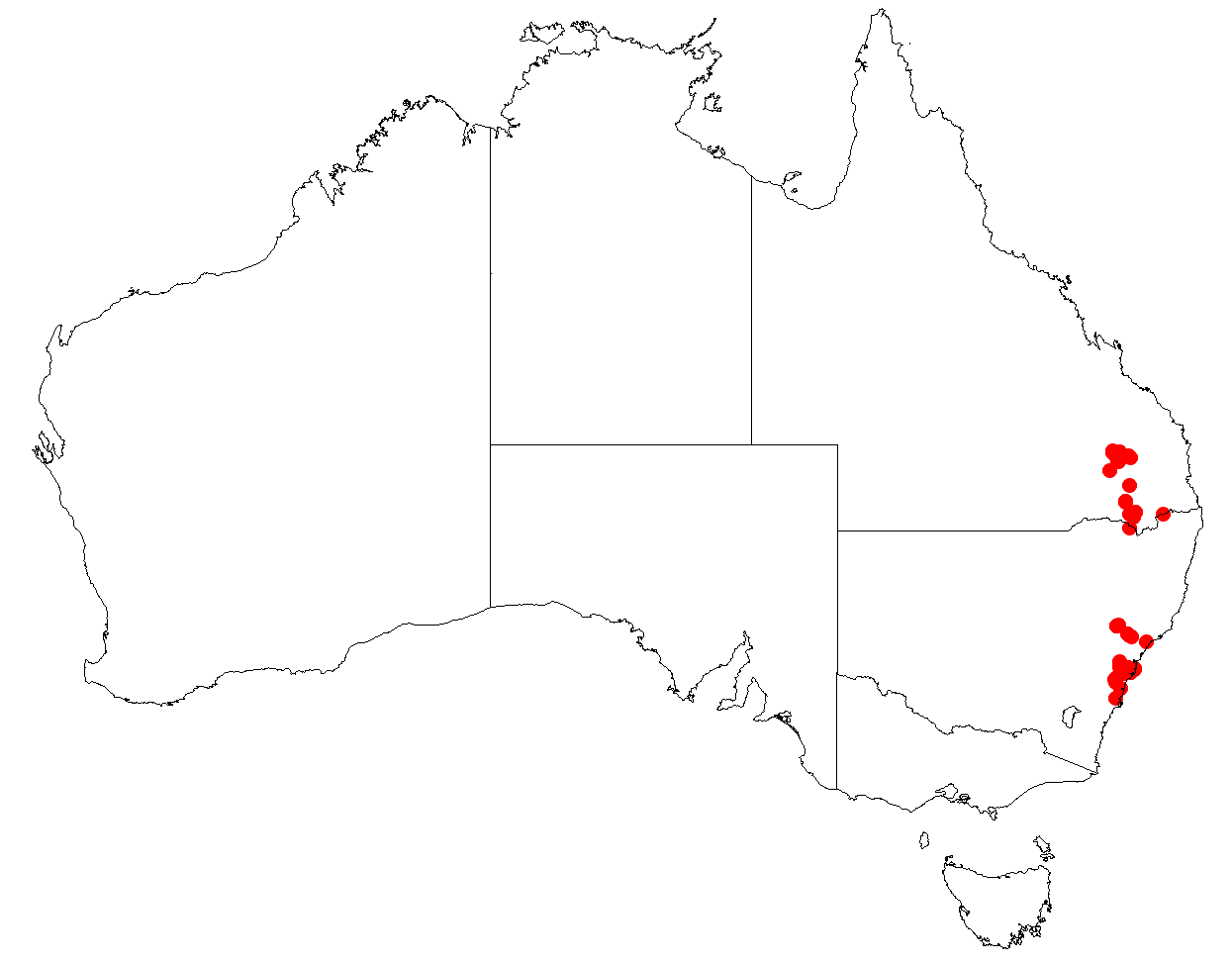
- Collections data for A. gaudichaudii from the Australasian Virtual Herbarium

Synonyms
- Amyema gaudichaudi Tiegh. orth. var.; Dendrophthoe gaudichaudii (DC.) G.Don; Loranthus gaudichaudii DC.; Loranthus pendulus var. parviflorus Benth. p.p.

= Amyema gaudichaudii =

Species of mistletoe

Amyema gaudichaudii, commonly known as melaleuca mistletoe, is a plant in the family Loranthaceae endemic to eastern Australia. Like other mistletoes, it is a shrubby, woody, aerial hemiparasite plant. It has relatively small, wedge-shaped leaves and small, dark red flowers arranged in groups of three. It only grows on a few species of Melaleuca.

== Description ==
Amyema gaudichaudii is a mistletoe with wedge-shaped leaves 2–4 cm (0.8–2 in) long, 2–6 mm (0.08–0.2 in) wide, tapering to a petiole 2–4 mm (0.08–0.2 in) long and with a rounded end. The plant is glabrous apart from a few short rust-coloured hairs on the young branches and flower buds. The flowers are arranged in a group of three, the group resembling a candelabra, with a stalk or peduncle 6–12 mm (0.2–0.5 in) long. The flowers on the end have a stalk or pedicel 2–4 mm (0.08–0.2 in) long but the central flower is stalkless. There are four or five dark red petals 7–10 mm (0.3–0.4 in) long with a club-like end. Flowering is mostly in summer and is followed by almost spherical, red fruits about 4 mm (0.2 in) in diameter.

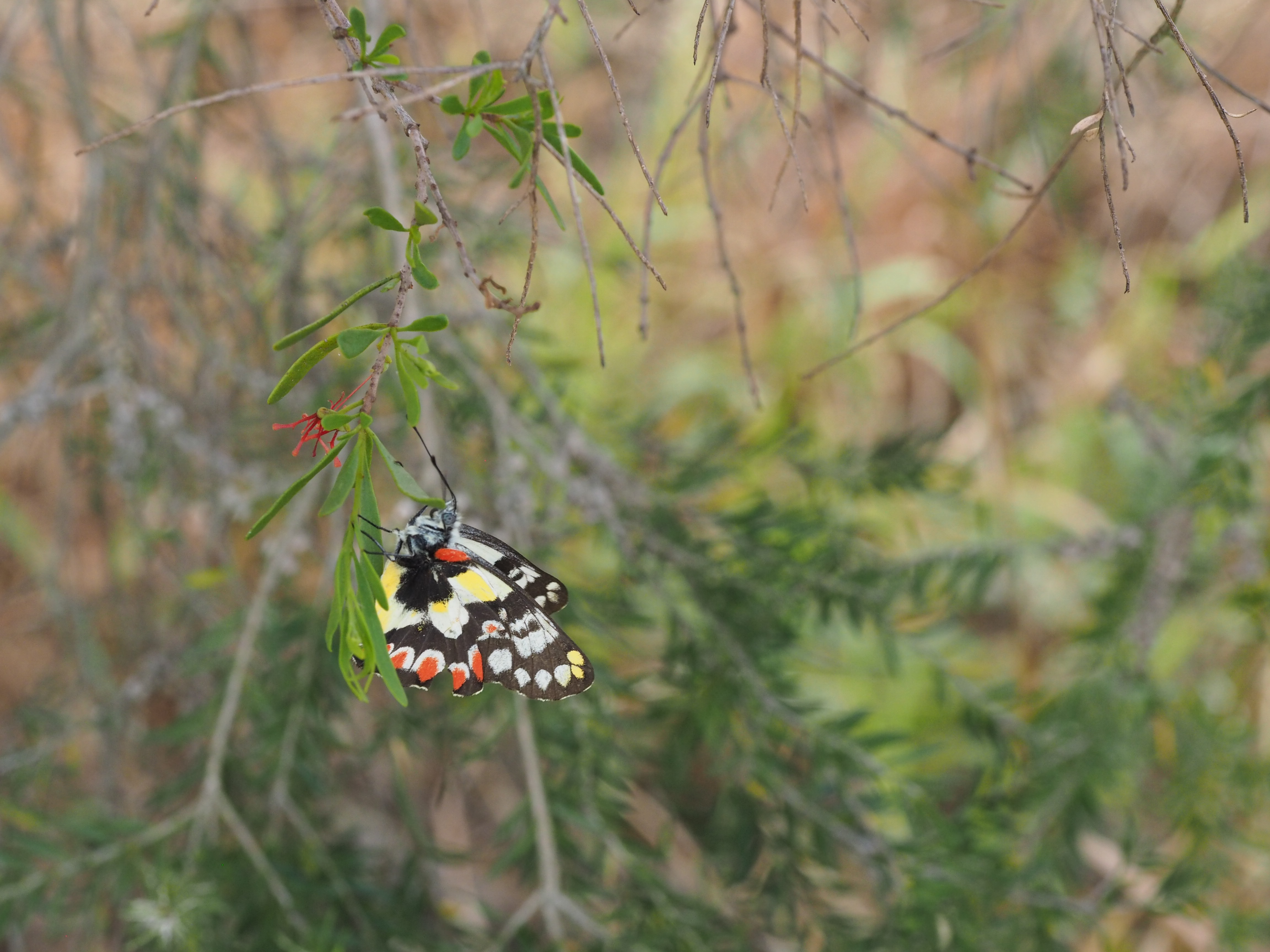
Delias aganippe laying eggs on Amyema gaudichaudii

== Taxonomy and naming ==
This mistletoe was first formally described in 1830 by Augustin Pyramus de Candolle, who gave it the name Loranthus gaudichaudii and published the description in Prodromus Systematis Naturalis Regni Vegetabilis. In 1895, the French botanist, Philippe Édouard Léon Van Tieghem changed the name to Amyema gaudichaudii. The specific epithet (gaudichaudii) honours Charles Gaudichaud-Beaupré, the collector of the type specimen.

== Distribution and habitat ==
Amyema gaudichaudii only grows on melaleucas in forest and swamp woodland. It has been recorded on seven species of melaleuca, especially on M. decora and M. bracteata. It occurs in two disjunct populations in Queensland and New South Wales. In Queensland it is found in the western Darling Downs and in New South Wales in coastal areas between the Hunter and Illawarra districts.

== Ecology ==
This mistletoe is a food source for the caterpillars of Delias aganippe and Ogyris amaryllis.
