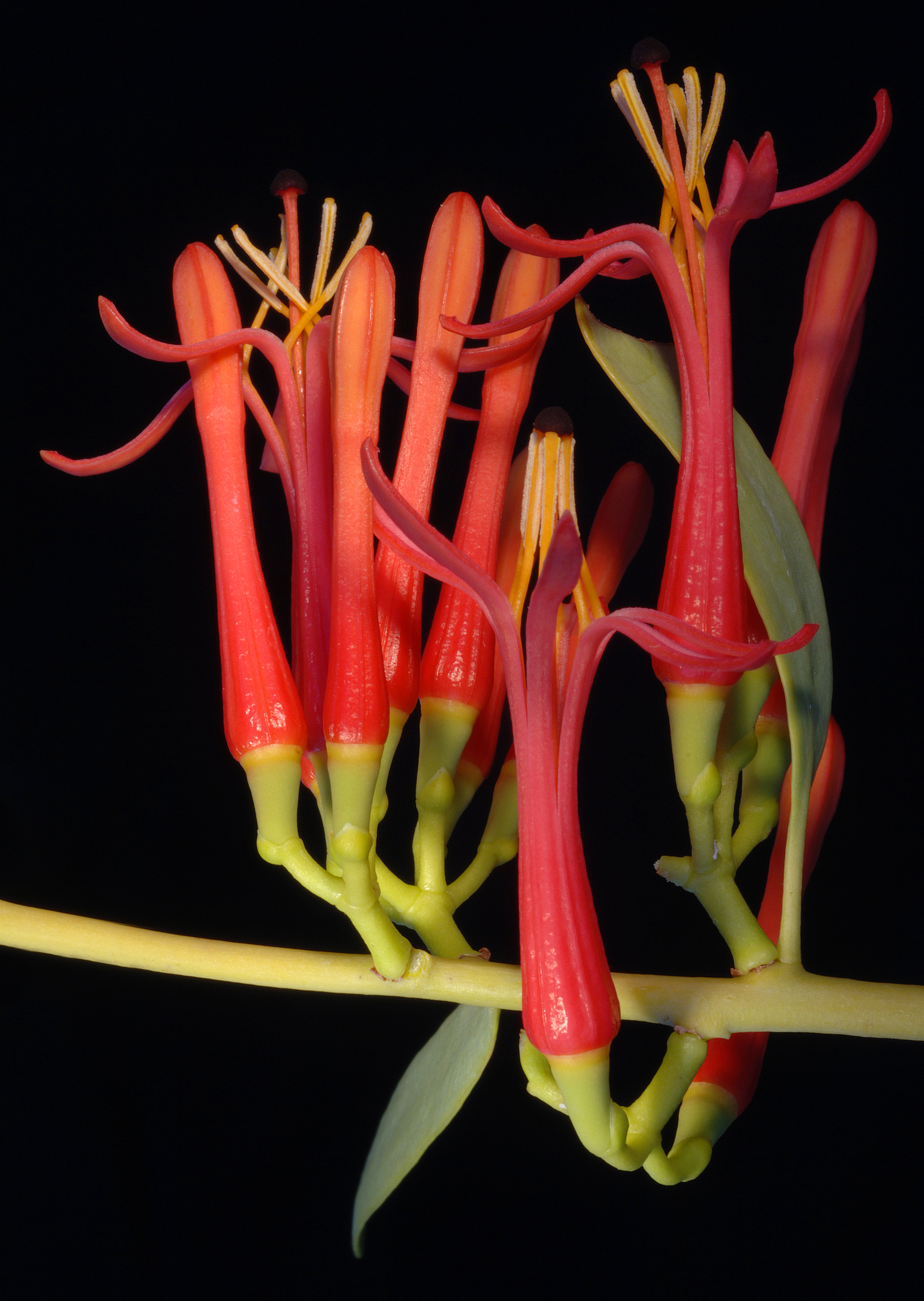
- Amyema sanguinea

Scientific classification
- Kingdom: Plantae
- Clade: Tracheophytes
- Clade: Angiosperms
- Clade: Eudicots
- Order: Santalales
- Family: Loranthaceae
- Genus: Amyema
- Species: A. sanguinea

Binomial name
- Amyema sanguinea (Muell.) Danser
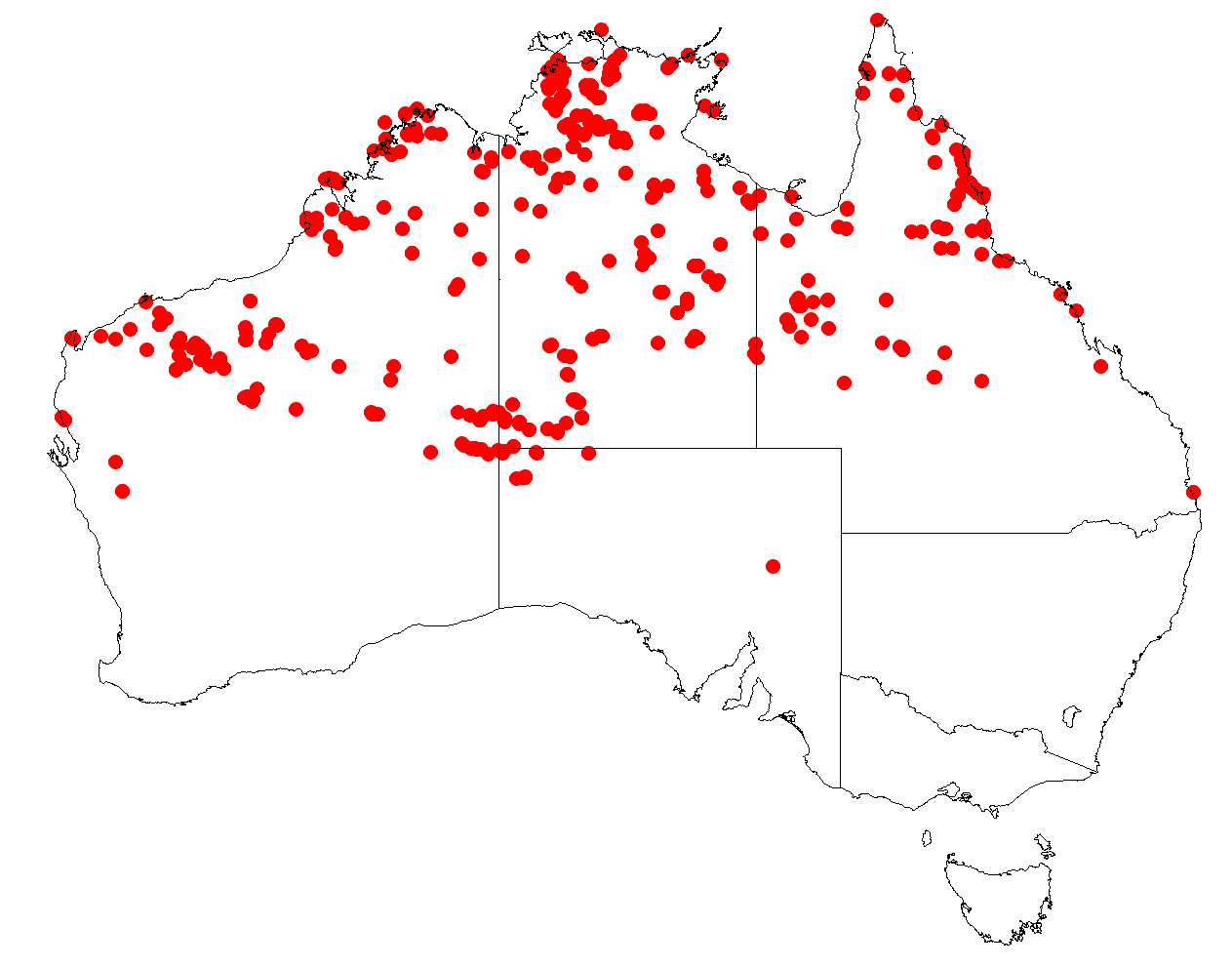
- Collections data for A. sanguinea from the Australasian Virtual Herbarium

Synonyms
- Treubella muelleriana Tiegh. Pilostigma sanguineum Tiegh. Pilostigma muelleri Tiegh. Loranthus sanguineus F. Muell. Loranthus muellerianus Tiegh. Loranthus muelleri Tiegh. Decaisnina muelleriana Tiegh. Amyema muelleri Danser

= Amyema sanguinea =

Species of mistletoe

Amyema sanguinea is an aerial hemiparasitic shrub within the genus Amyema, in the family Loranthaceae and native to Australia, where it is found in New South Wales, Queensland, the Northern Territory, South Australia and Western Australia.

== Description ==
Its leaves are flat and opposite (sometimes appearing alternate). Its inflorescence is a simple umbel with 3-6 flowers, on a stem. Flowering from January to December, its erect flowers shade from pinky-red to an orange-red. The yellow stamens do not project beyond the corolla. The mature buds have six ribs.

== Ecology ==
A. sanguinea is usually found on eucalypts, but is sometimes found on Melaleucas or Acacias. Downey's list of hosts gives 33 eucalyptus hosts. It is used by at least seven species of moths and butterflies (Delias argenthona, Candalides margarita gilberti, Hippochrysops digglesii, Ogyris amaryllis meridionalis, Ogyris iphis doddi, Ogyris zosine and Comocrus behri).

== Taxonomy ==
A. sanguinea was first described by Ferdinand von Mueller as Loranthus sanguineus in 1859. Danser, in 1929, allocated the species to the genus, Amyema in 1929.
