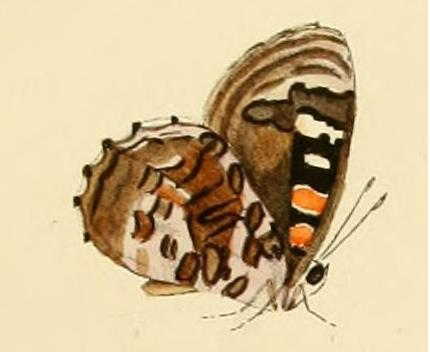

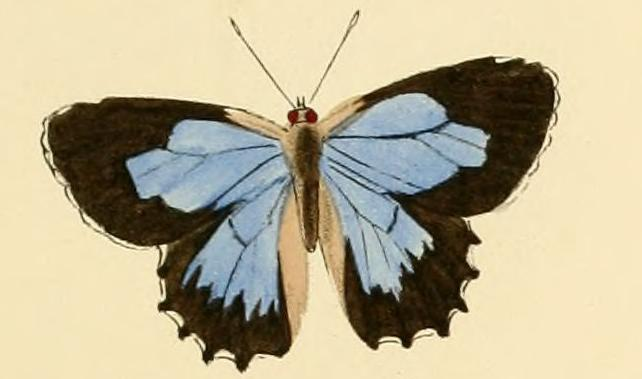

Scientific classification
- Kingdom: Animalia
- Phylum: Arthropoda
- Class: Insecta
- Order: Lepidoptera
- Family: Lycaenidae
- Genus: Ogyris
- Species: O. amaryllis

Binomial name
- Ogyris amaryllis Hewitson, 1862

Synonyms
- Ogyris catharina C. & R. Felder, 1865; Ogyris amata Waterhouse, 1934; Ogyris hewitsoni Waterhouse, 1902; Ogyris meridionalis Bethune-Baker, 1905; Ogyris hopensis Burns, [1948]; Ogyris parsonsi Angel, 1951

= Ogyris amaryllis =

Species of butterfly

Ogyris amaryllis, the amaryllis azure or satin azure, is a butterfly in the family Lycaenidae. It is found in Australia.

The wingspan is about 35 mm.

The larvae feed on Amyema species, including A. bifurcata, A. cambagei, A. congener, A. fitzgeraldii, A. linophyllum, A. lucasii, A. mackayensis, A. maidenii, A. melaleucae, A. miquelii, A. miraculosum, A. pendula, A. preissii, A. quandang, A. sanguinea and A. thalassium.

== Subspecies ==
- O. a. amaryllis (New South Wales: Brisbane to Tuggerah)
- O. a. amata Waterhouse, 1934 (Canberra area)
- O. a. hewitsoni (Waterhouse, 1902) (Cairns to Maryborough)
- O. a. meridionalis Bethune-Baker, 1905 (eastern Australia and Western Australia)
- O. a. parsonsis Angel, 1951 (central Australia)

== Image gallery ==
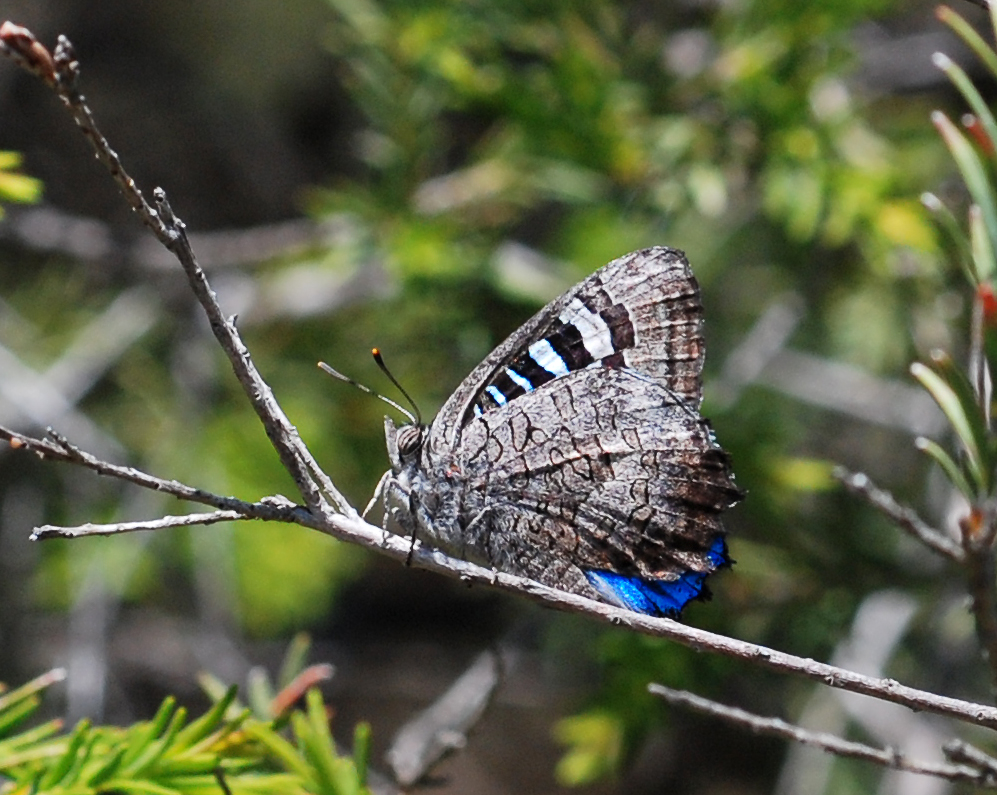
Ogyris amaryllis on a Melaleuca teretifolia stem - 2008

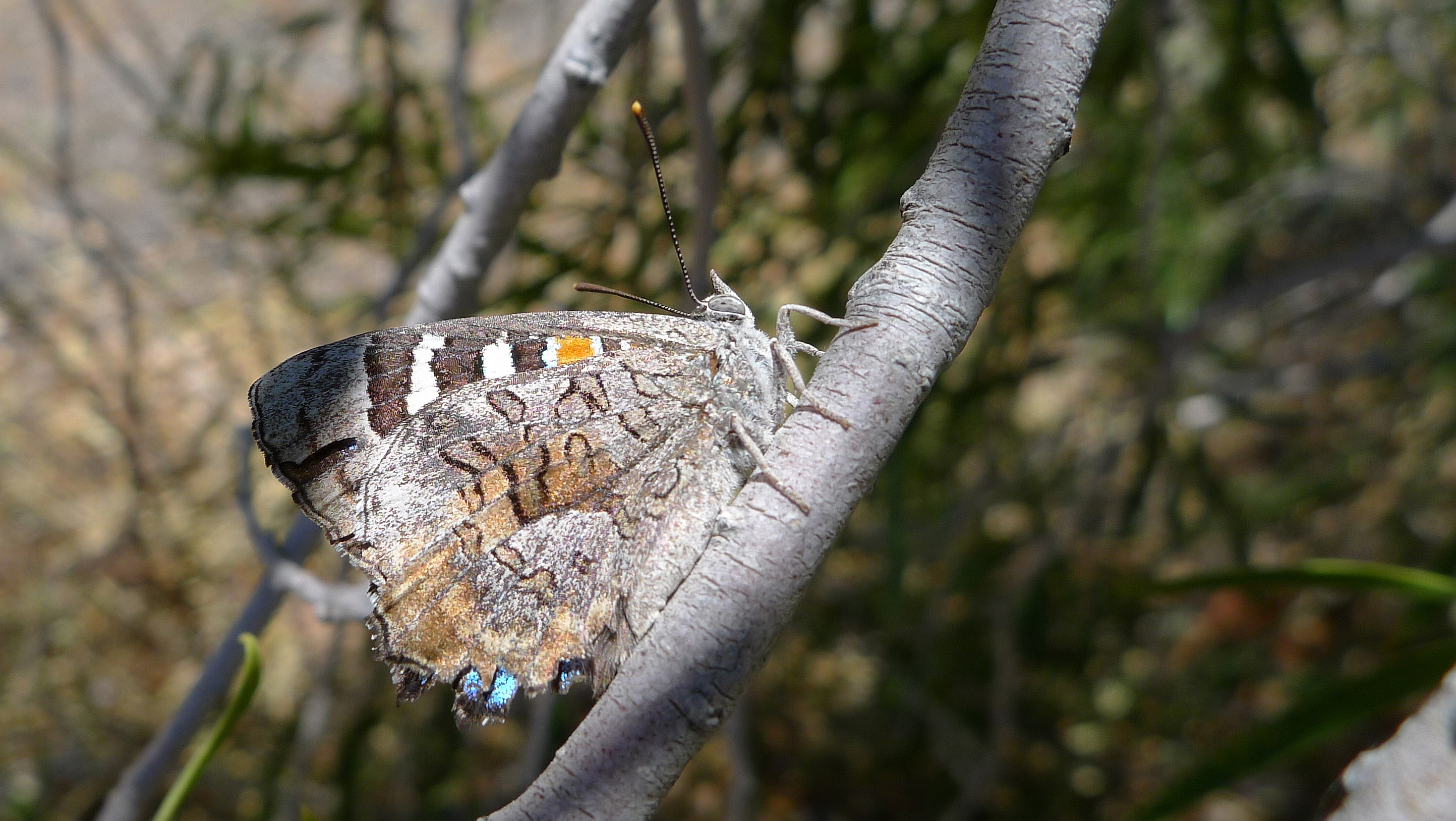
Ogyris amaryllis on Pittosporum angustifolium -Living Desert State Park, Broken Hill, Australia - 2014

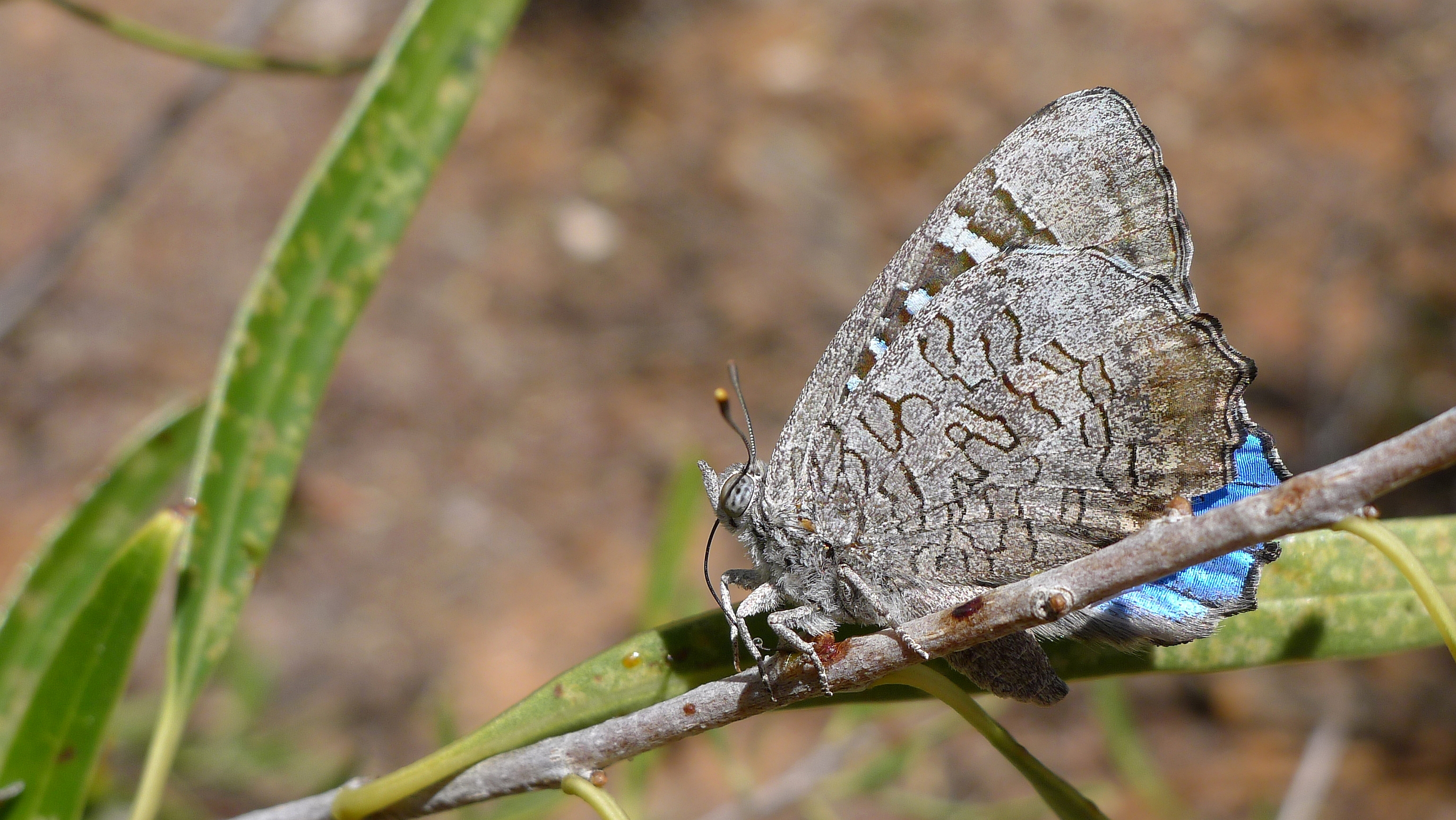
Ogyris amaryllis on Pittosporum angustifolium - Living Desert State Park, Broken Hill, Australia - 2014
