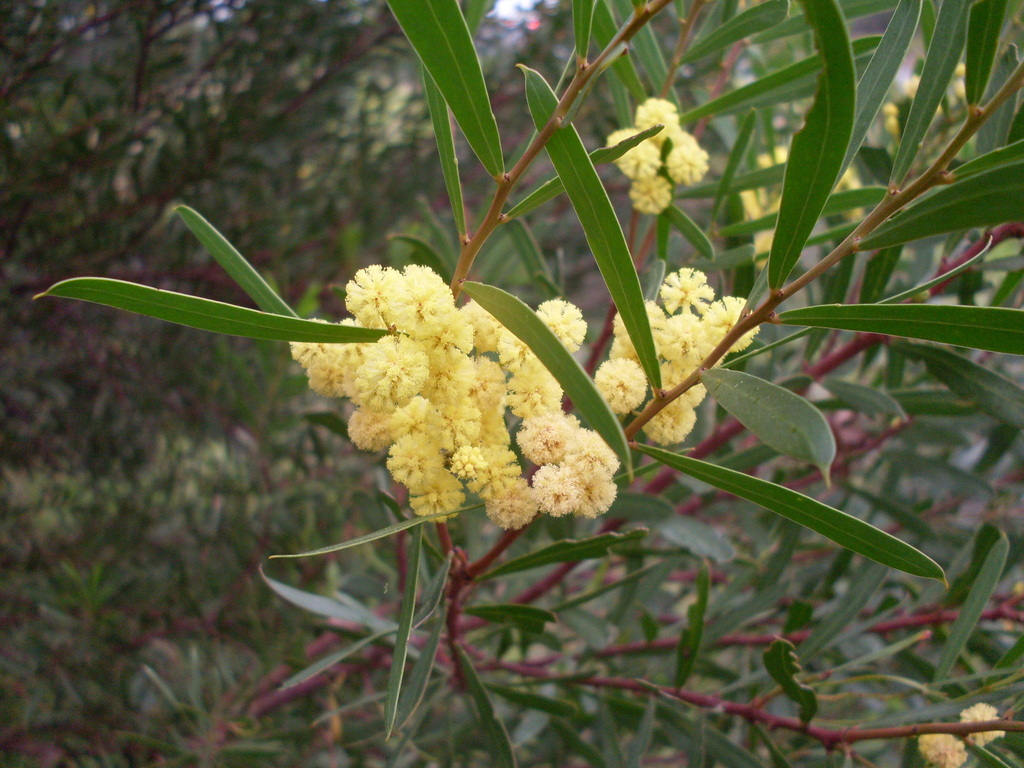

Scientific classification
- Kingdom: Plantae
- Clade: Embryophytes
- Clade: Tracheophytes
- Clade: Spermatophytes
- Clade: Angiosperms
- Clade: Eudicots
- Clade: Rosids
- Order: Fabales
- Family: Fabaceae
- Subfamily: Caesalpinioideae
- Clade: Mimosoid clade
- Genus: Acacia
- Species: A. uncifolia

Binomial name
- Acacia uncifolia (J.M.Black) O'Leary
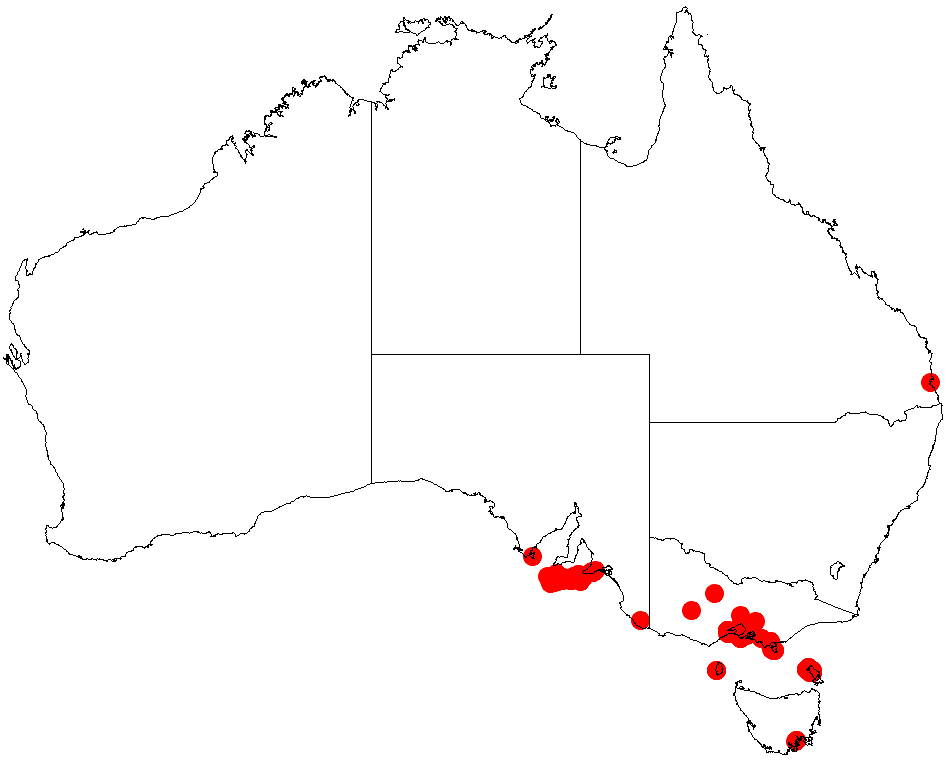
- Occurrence data from AVH

Synonyms
- Acacia retinoides var. uncifolia

= Acacia uncifolia =

Species of plant

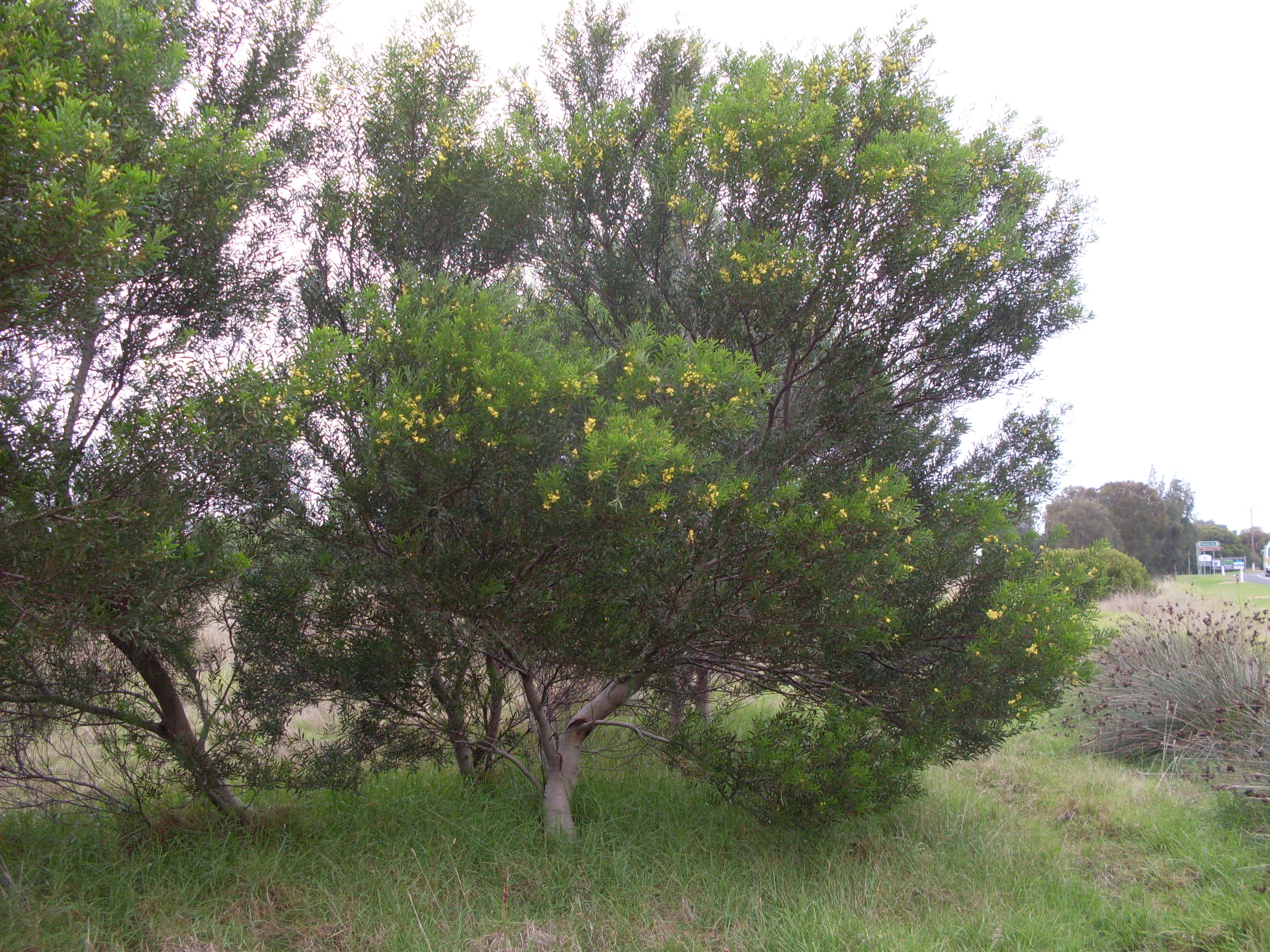
Habit near Queenscliff

Acacia uncifolia, commonly known as coast wirilda, is a wattle endemic to south-eastern Australia. It grows as a tall shrub or small tree, up to 2–6 m high and 2–4 m wide, in coastal areas of South Australia and Victoria, as well as on Tasmania’s Flinders Island and possibly other islands in Bass Strait. Its preferred habitats are coastal heathland, shrubland and dry open woodland on calcarenite soils. The phyllodes have hooked tips and the flowers are pale yellow. It is a host of the wireleaf mistletoe. It is listed as Rare under Tasmania's Threatened Species Protection Act 1995.
