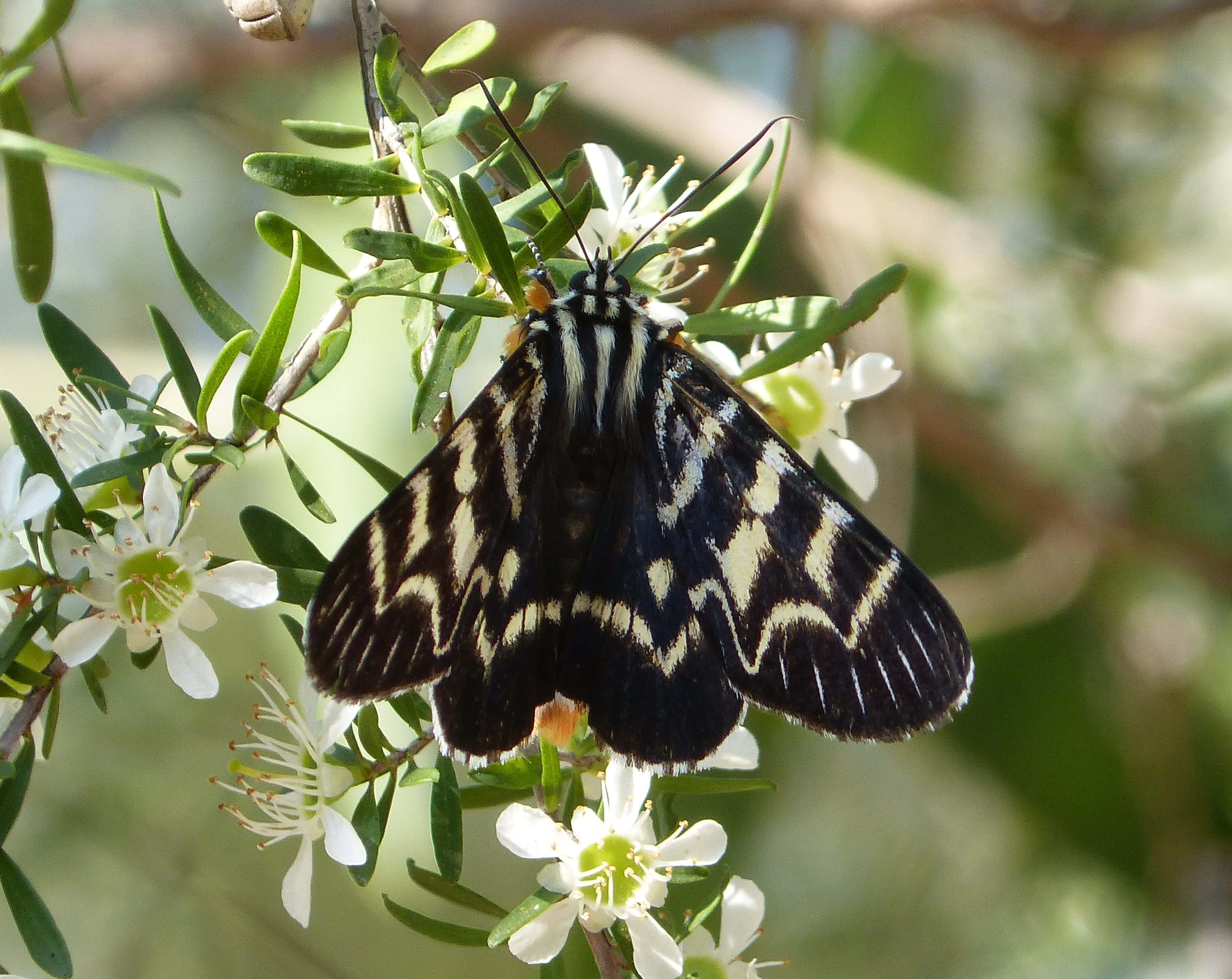

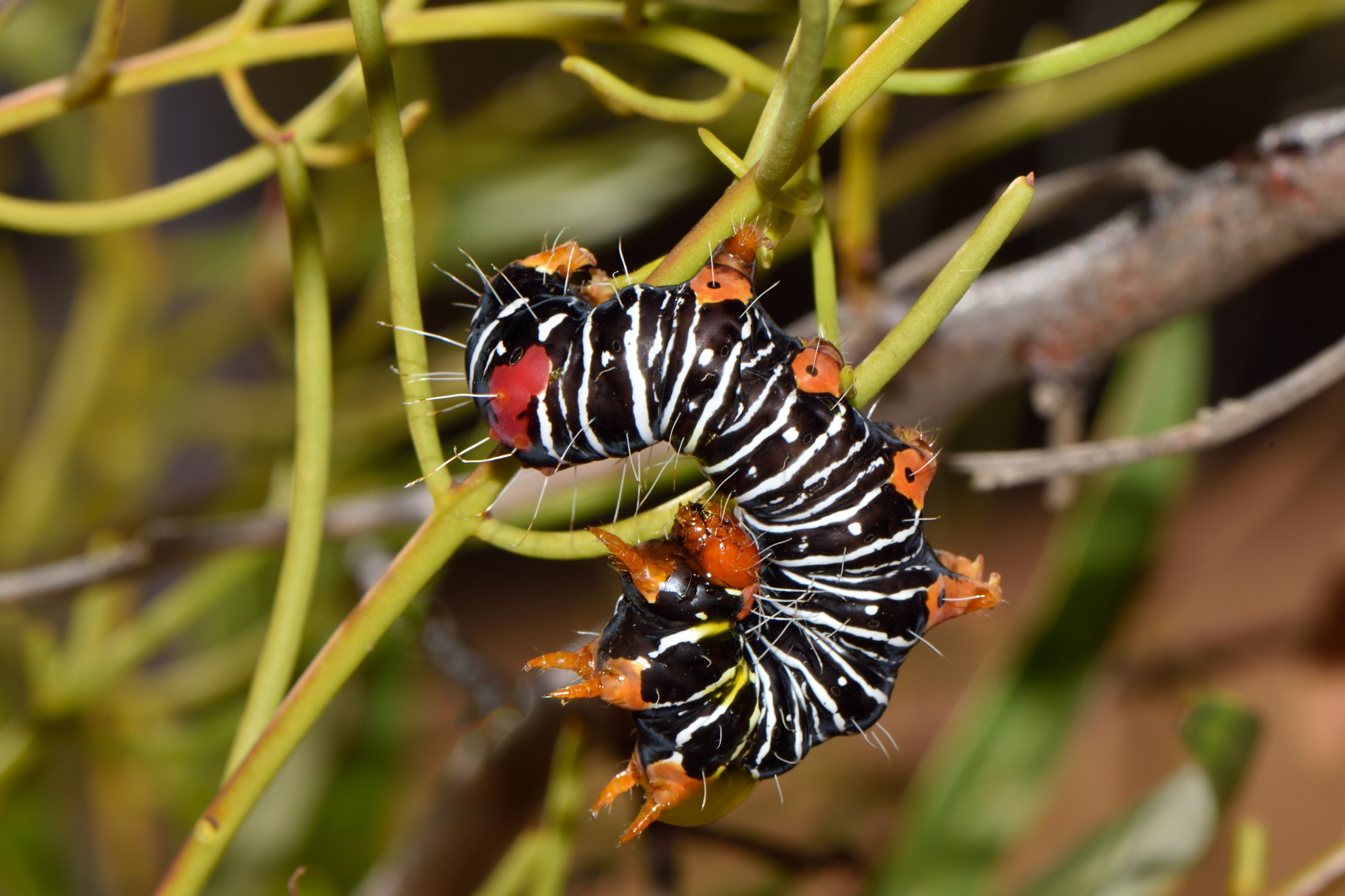

Scientific classification
- Kingdom: Animalia
- Phylum: Arthropoda
- Clade: Pancrustacea
- Class: Insecta
- Order: Lepidoptera
- Superfamily: Noctuoidea
- Family: Noctuidae
- Subfamily: Agaristinae
- Genus: Comocrus; Jordan in Rothschild & Jordan, 1896
- Species: C. behri

Binomial name
- Comocrus behri (Angas, 1847)

= Comocrus =

Species of moth

Comocrus is a monotypic moth genus in the family Noctuidae erected by Karl Jordan in 1896. Its only species, Comocrus behri, the mistletoe moth or mistletoe day moth, was first described by George French Angas in 1847. It is widely distributed in southern Australia from Perth to Melbourne and adjacent to Bass Strait, occurring as far north as Derby, Western Australia, and Clermont and Rockhampton in Queensland. It may be seen during daylight hours hovering around mistletoe species such as Amyema miquelii, Amyema melaleucae and Amyema cambadgei growing on Casuarina and Eucalyptus trees. The adult moths feed on Eucalyptus flower nectar, have a wingspan of some 58 millimetres and are basically black with white bands running through the wings. Individuals ready to mate exhibit 'hill-topping' behaviour, flying to high points in the landscape and there encountering mates.

== Synonyms ==
- Agarista casuarinae Scott, 1864
- Agarista flexuosa Walker, 1865
- Agarista contorta Walker, 1865
- Agarista cortortus Jordan, 1896
- Agarista casuarina Jordan, 1912
- Agarista cortutus Nye, 1975
