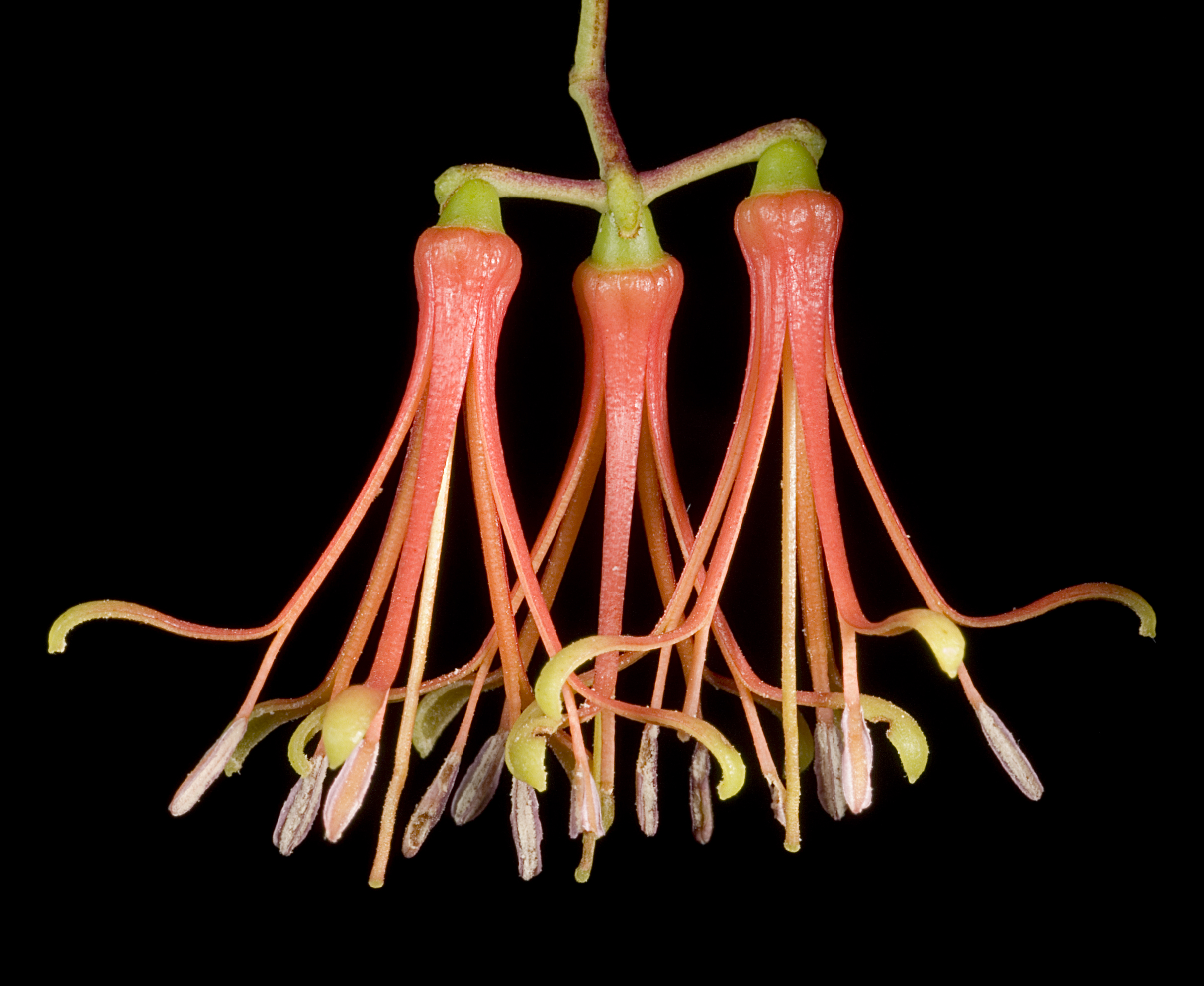

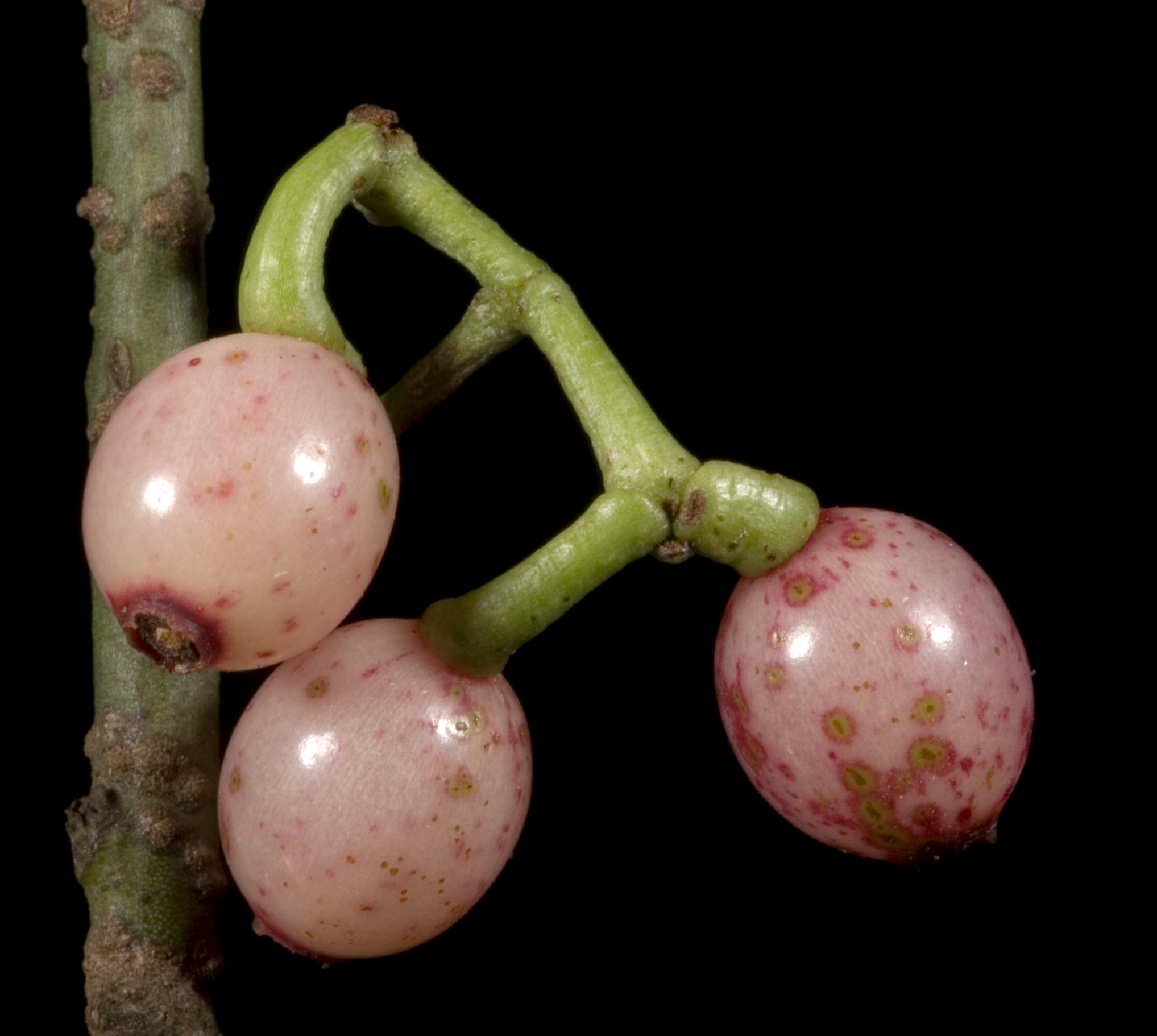

Scientific classification
- Kingdom: Plantae
- Clade: Tracheophytes
- Clade: Angiosperms
- Clade: Eudicots
- Order: Santalales
- Family: Loranthaceae
- Genus: Amyema
- Species: A. preissii

Binomial name
- Amyema preissii (Miq.) Tiegh.
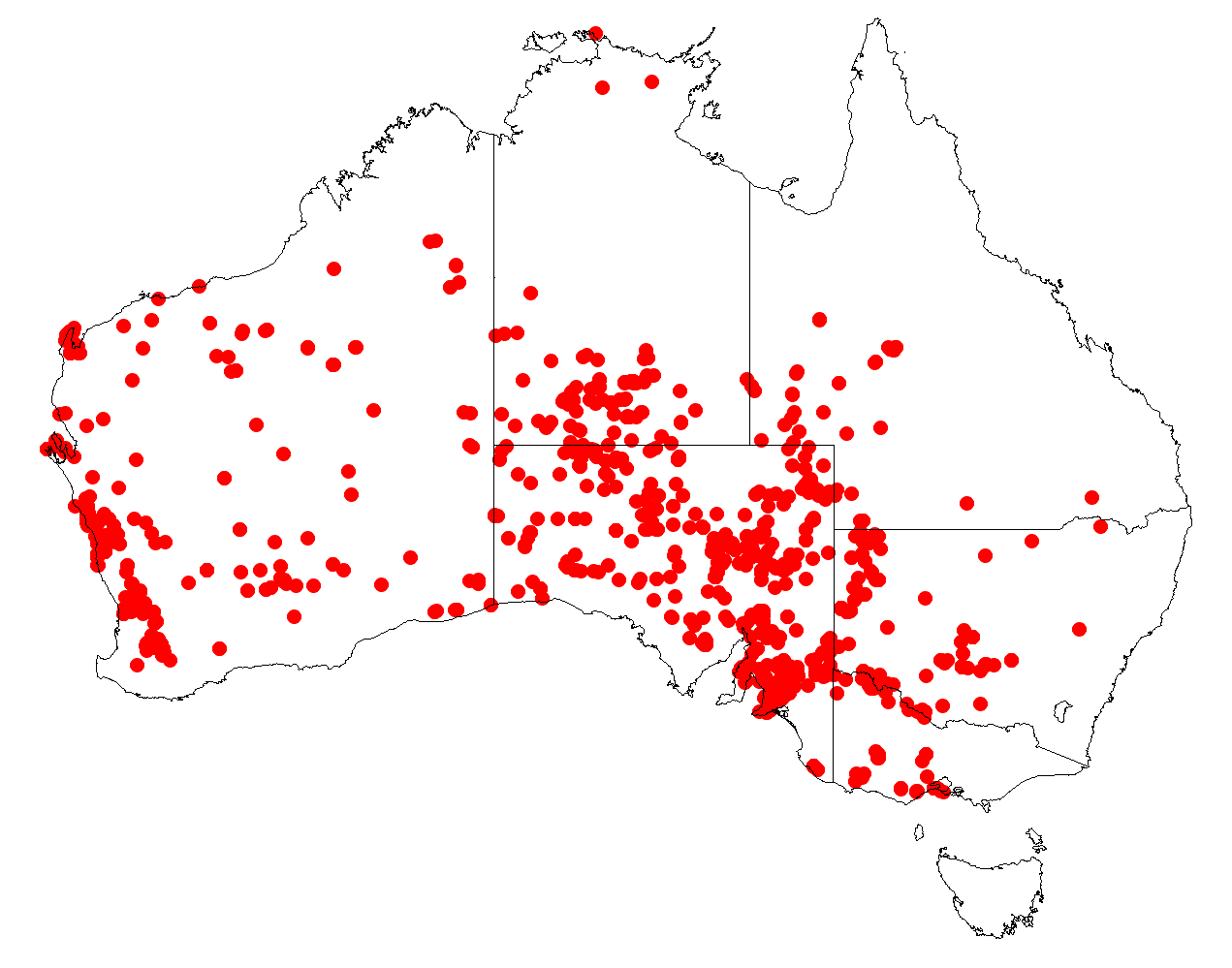
- Collections data for A. preissii from the Australasian Virtual Herbarium

= Amyema preissii =

Species of plant

Amyema preissii, commonly known as wireleaf mistletoe, is a species of mistletoe, an epiphytic, hemiparasitic plant of the family Loranthaceae. It is native to Australia where it has been recorded from all mainland states. The flowers are red and up to 26 mm long. The fruits are white or pink, globose and 8–10 mm in diameter. Its habitat is sclerophyll forest and woodland where it is often found on wattles. On Victoria's Bellarine Peninsula its hosts include coast wirilda, golden wattle and drooping sheoak. Its sticky seeds are eaten and dispersed by mistletoebirds.

== Description ==
Amyema Preissii is the only mistletoe with slender, needle-shaped leaves and all-red flowers lacking velvety covering, in groups of three. This distinctive mistletoe has feathery foliage, composed of soft, needle-like leaves (with pointed, but not sharp, tips). Foliage is either open and loosely branched or dense and very closely branched, with individual plants often displaying both variants. This Mistletoe presents abundant orange-red flowers, with smooth bases and buds, borne in groups of three. The closed, downward-hanging flower consists of five Tepal, which are fused into a long tube with a bulbous end.

The fruit is a dark pink, translucent, globular berry, 6-10mm long. A shiny cuticle covers the rind which surrounds a mucilaginous viscid layer occupying most of the volume of the fruit. In the centre lies the seed with a well-developed Endosperm and green embryo projecting toward the distal end of the fruit. Part of the Hypocotyl protrudes from the seed and this may elongate up to 10mm on germination. The apex is swollen even at this stage and within its tip the primary Haustorium is produced.

Distinguished from otherwise similar Samphire mistletoe by longer leaves (at least 2cm long) and from Harrow-leaved, Casuarina, Amyema cambagei (Needle-leaved), Allocasuarina luehmannii and Amyema gibberula mistletoes by smooth flower buds arranged in groups of three and by translucent fruit.

== Distribution and habitat ==
The family Loranthaceae is native to Australia, with 75 species of showy mistletoe currently recognised.

A member of the Loranthaceae family, Amyema Preissii is among the most widespread of the Australian Mistletoes. It occurs in all mainland states and its preferred habitat is open forest, woodland and semi-arid woodland, particularly these types of habitats dominated by Acacia species. Amyema Preissii is highly host specific and shows a preference for Acacia victoriae, especially in Western Australia, as a functional host.

== Etymology ==
Amyema derives from the Greek a (negative) and myeo (I, Initiate), referring to the genus being previously unrecognised.

Named after a German botanist, Ludwig Preiss, who was a botanical collector in Western Australia.

== Reproduction and dispersal ==
In Australia, Lorantheceous mistletoes depend on birds for pollination and dispersal, and provide important nectar and fruit resources to a large number of nectarivore and frugivore birds.

Amyema Preissii is dispersed by at least two species of frugivorous birds; especially the mistletoebird.

Seedlings establish successfully or die within three months. Survivors normally grow rapidly and flower eighteen months later, producing fruit at three years old, although under ideal conditions seedlings can develop into a mature, fruiting plant in just nine months. After maturing, they fruit annually until death. Lifespan is a maximum of around seventeen years.

Mistletoes have no seed bank and must be dispersed on host branches with well-defined characteristics to have a chance of survival. To aid with seed dispersion onto host branches the mistletoe's seeds are incredibly sticky because they are covered with a glue-like substance called viscin that helps them stick to whatever they fall on.
