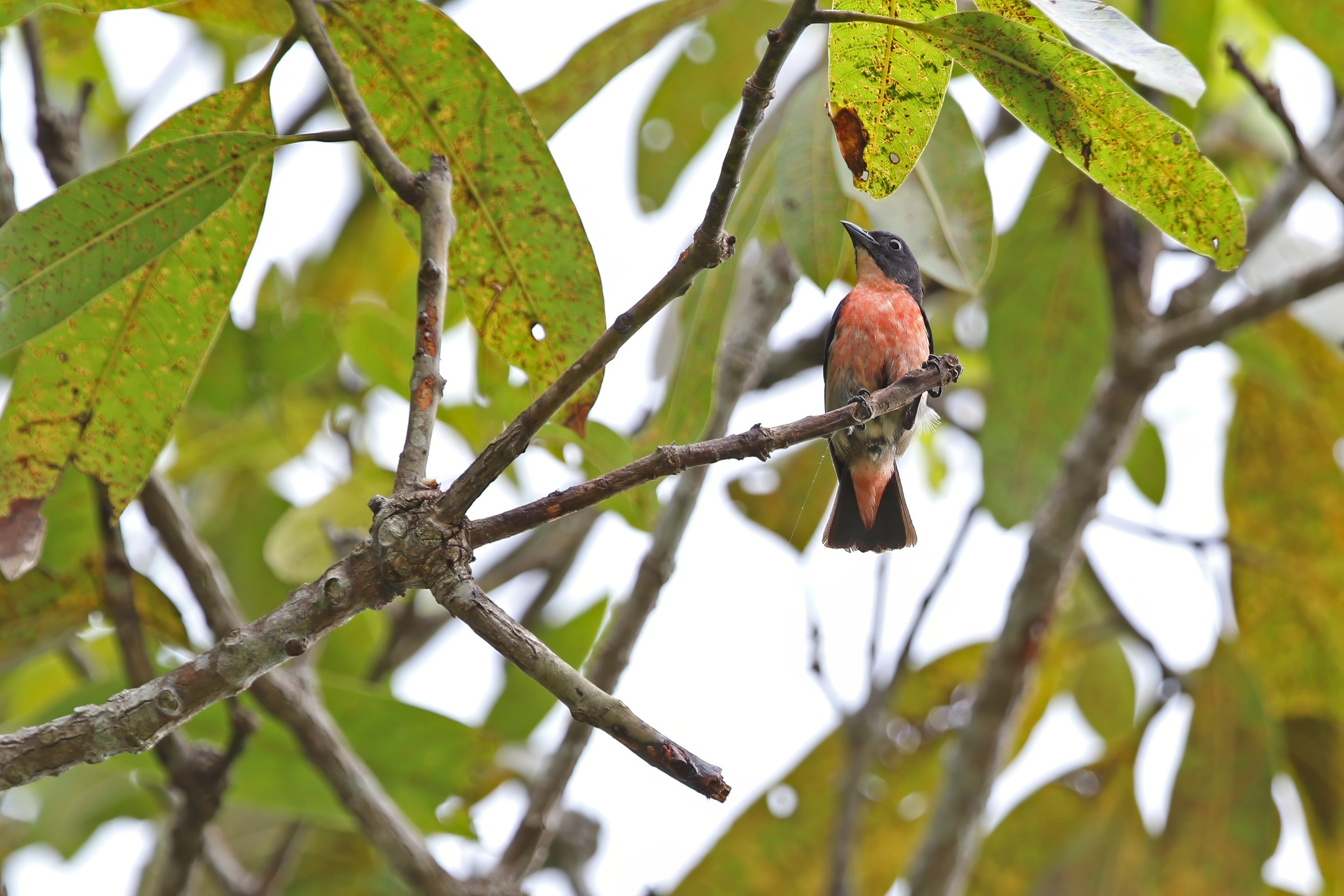

Conservation status
- Least Concern (IUCN 3.1)

Scientific classification
- Kingdom: Animalia
- Phylum: Chordata
- Class: Aves
- Order: Passeriformes
- Family: Dicaeidae
- Genus: Dicaeum
- Species: D. keiense

Binomial name
- Dicaeum keiense Salvadori, 1874

= Pink-breasted flowerpecker =

Species of bird

The pink-breasted flowerpecker (Dicaeum keiense) is a species of bird in the family Dicaeidae that is native to the south and southeast Maluku Islands of Indonesia. It was formerly considered a subspecies of the mistletoebird (Dicaeum hirundinaceum).

== Taxonomy ==
The pink-breasted flowerpecker was formally described in 1874 by the Italian zoologist Tommaso Salvadori based on a specimen collected on the Kai Islands by the Italian botanist Odoardo Beccari. Salvadori coined the binomial name Dicaeum keiense. The specific epithet is from the alternative spelling "Kei" for the Kai Islands. The pink-breasted flowerpecker was formerly considered as a subspecies of the mistletoebird (Dicaeum hirundinaceum).

Two subspecies are recognised:

- D. k. keiense Salvadori, 1874 – Tayandu Islands, Kai Islands and Watubela archipelago (southeast Maluku Islands)
- D. k. fulgidum Sclater, PL, 1883 – Tanimbar Islands (south Maluku Islands)
