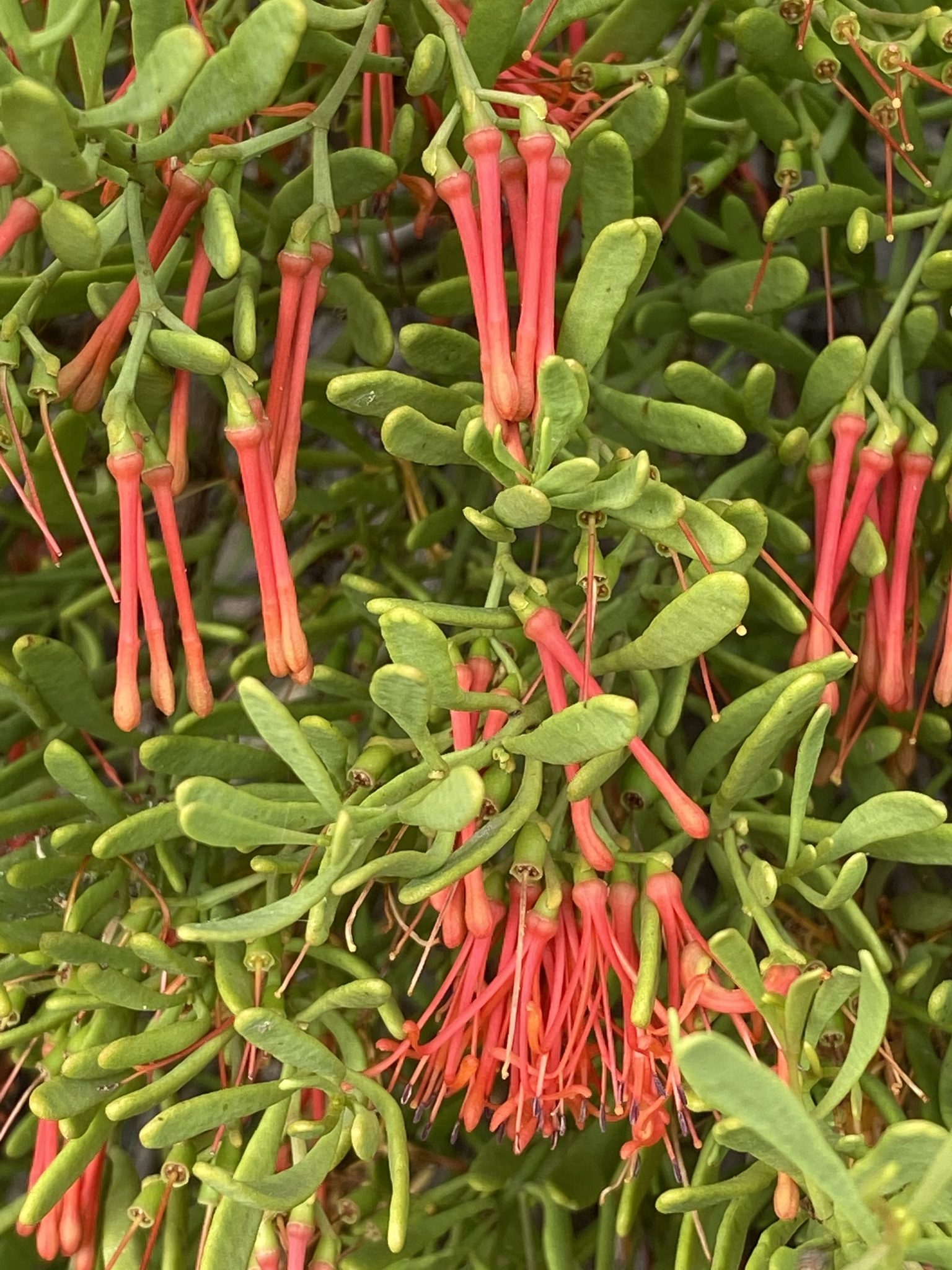

Scientific classification
- Kingdom: Plantae
- Clade: Tracheophytes
- Clade: Angiosperms
- Clade: Eudicots
- Order: Santalales
- Family: Loranthaceae
- Genus: Amyema
- Species: A. melaleucae

Binomial name
- Amyema melaleucae (Lehm. ex Miq.) Tiegh.
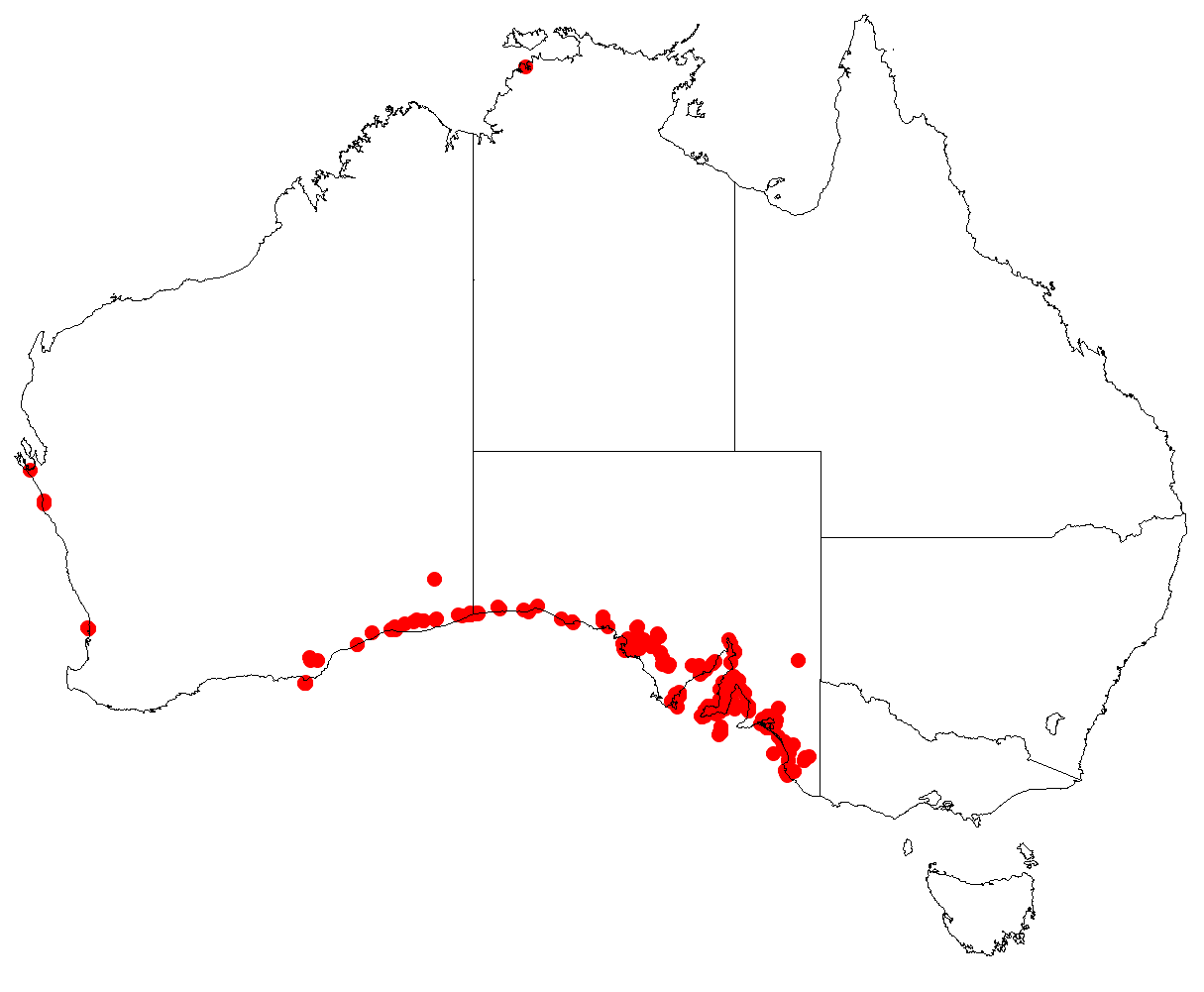
- Collections data from the Australasian Virtual Herbarium

Synonyms
- Amyema leschenaultii Tiegh.; Loranthus melaleucae Lehm.; Loranthus miraculosus var. melaleucae (Miq.) Blakely; Loranthus pendulus var. melaleucae (Miq.) Tate

= Amyema melaleucae =

Species of plant

Amyema melaleucae, also known as the tea-tree mistletoe, is a species of flowering plant within the genus Amyema, an epiphytic hemiparasitic plant of the family Loranthaceae native to Australia and found in Western Australia and South Australia on the coast, from north of Perth almost to the Victorian border.

== Description ==
It is an erect shrub with a single haustorium. The leaves are narrow and lanceolate (20 to 45 mm long and from 2 to 4 (sometimes) 7 mm wide) with no petiole, and rounded at the apex. Unlike many other Amyemas, the corolla in bud is smooth. The inflorescence consists of an umbel of triads (flowers in groups of three) on a stalk (peduncle). The central flower is without a stem (pedicel), while the lateral flowers are on angular pedicels. The corolla is club-shaped. The flowers are pink and red and may be seen from January to April or August to November. The fruit is almost globular.

== Ecology ==
It grows in coastal scrub, (usually) on Melaleucas., Barlow (1984) and Paczkowska (1995) both state that is only found on Melaleucas. However, an extensive examination of herbaria records by Downey (1998) showed that it has been found on Casuarina species, Myoporum species, Exocarpos species and Pittosporum species, as well as Melaleuca cardiophylla, M. halmaturorum, M. lanceolata, M. parviflora, M. pauperiflora, Melaleuca pubescens (=M. lanceolata), M. quadrifaria and M. thyoides.

== Taxonomy ==
It was first described by Miquel in 1845 as Loranthus melaleucae, who described it from a specimen found growing on a Melaleuca on Rottnest Island. In 1895 it was placed in the genus Amyema by Tieghem.
