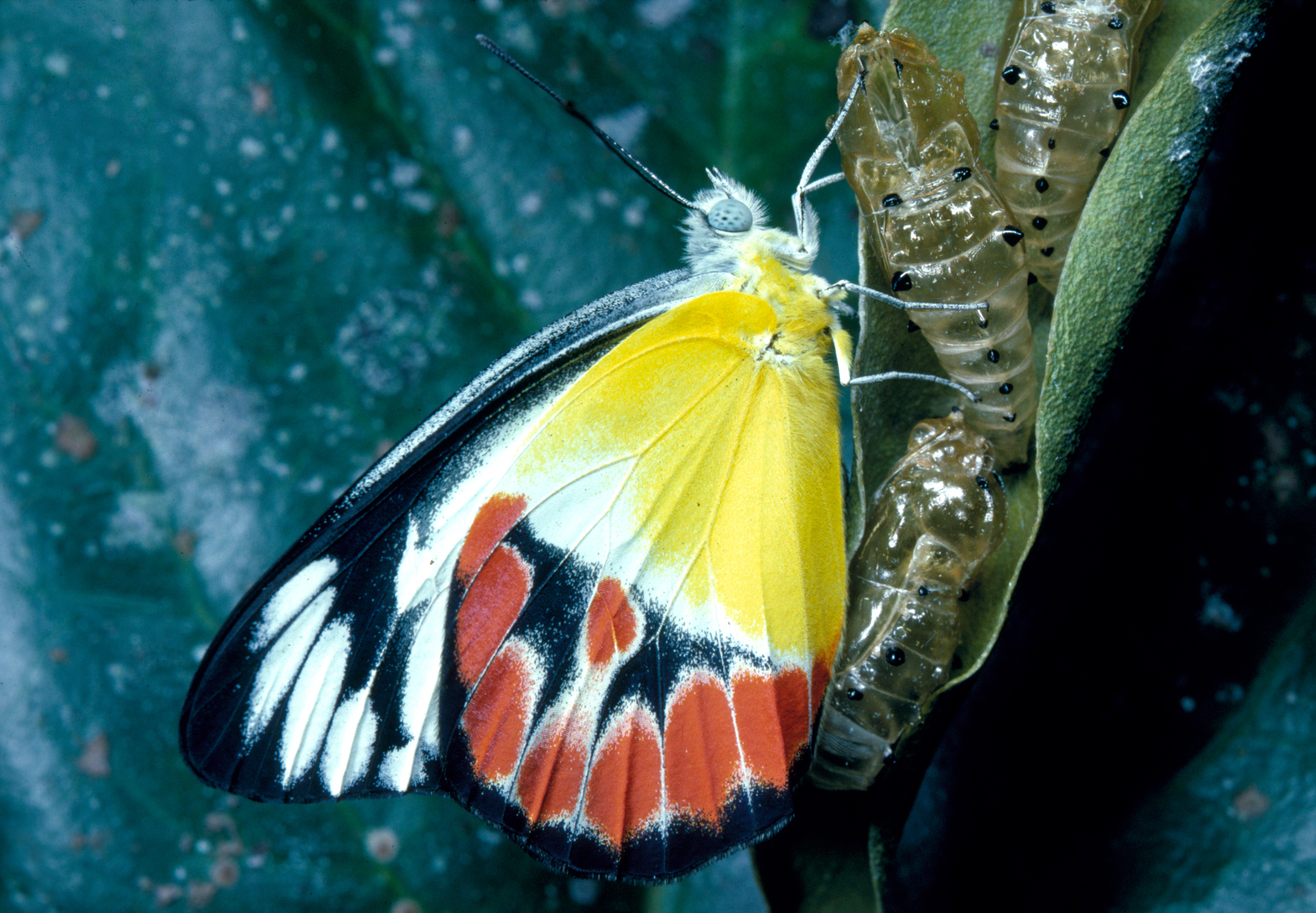

Scientific classification
- Kingdom: Animalia
- Phylum: Arthropoda
- Class: Insecta
- Order: Lepidoptera
- Family: Pieridae
- Genus: Delias
- Species: D. argenthona

Binomial name
- Delias argenthona Fabricius, 1793

= Delias argenthona =

Species of butterfly

Delias argenthona, the scarlet Jezebel or northern Jezebel, is a medium-sized butterfly of the family Pieridae found in Australia and New Guinea. Its caterpillars feed on showy mistletoes, family Loranthaceae.

== Description ==
D. argenthona F. (53 e). male above with the apex of the forewing somewhat more broadly suffused with black than in fasciata. Hindwing with the red spots of the under surface showing through in rose-colour. The female occurs in two forms, one with the upper surface entirely light yellow and another with the distal half of the hind- wing entirely black: seminigra form. nov. (55 a). — fragalactea Btlr. (58 e), with red apex to the cell and somewhat broader black submarginal bands on the hindwing, may be regarded as a seasonal form, perhaps even only a casual aberration. Australia.

== Taxonomy ==
argenthona is a member of the hyparete species group.
