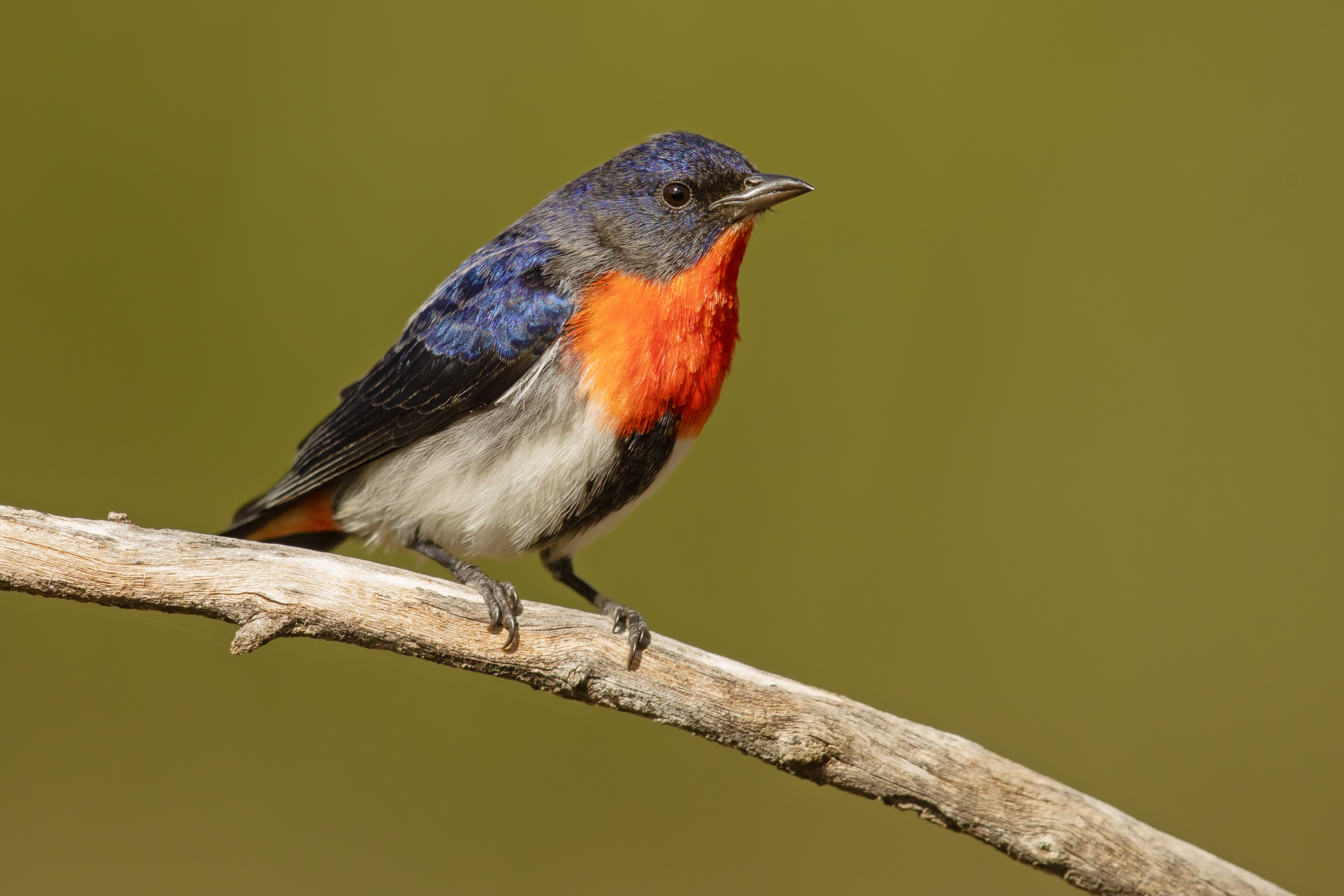
- Male

Conservation status
- Least Concern (IUCN 3.1)

Scientific classification
- Kingdom: Animalia
- Phylum: Chordata
- Class: Aves
- Order: Passeriformes
- Family: Dicaeidae
- Genus: Dicaeum
- Species: D. hirundinaceum

Binomial name
- Dicaeum hirundinaceum (Shaw, 1792)
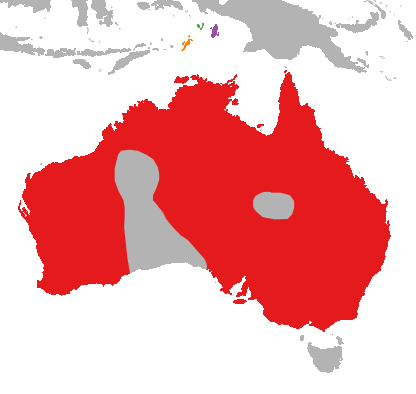
- Distribution map of Dicaeum hirundinaceum hirundinaceum in red, (top-centre:) and D. h. ignicolle in purple. Also shown are D. keiense fulgidum in orange and D. k. keiense in green, formerly considered subspecies of D. hirundinaceum but currently split as D. keiense.

= Mistletoebird =

Species of bird

The mistletoebird (Dicaeum hirundinaceum), also known as the mistletoe flowerpecker, is a species of flowerpecker native to most of Australia (though absent from Tasmania and the driest desert areas) and also to the eastern Maluku Islands of Indonesia in the Arafura Sea between Australia and New Guinea. The mistletoebird eats mainly the berries of the parasitic mistletoe and is a vector for the spread of the mistletoe's seeds through its digestive system.

== Taxonomy and evolution ==
The mistletoebird is one of 54 species of the flowerpecker family Dicaeidae. The flowerpeckers are considered to be nearest in avian evolutionary relationship to the sunbird family Nectariniidae. Both the flowerpeckers and sunbirds are thought to be early offshoots of the early passeroid radiation that occurred 20-30 million years ago. The sunbirds are found mainly in Africa and Asia and the flowerpeckers throughout Asia. The mistletoebird is a geologically recent arrival into Australia from South-East Asia. It is thought to have started colonizing Australia from about two million years ago.

The mistletoebird is a mistletoe-feeding specialist and mistletoe-feeding specialists have evolved independently in eight of the world's avian families. This extreme dietary specialization has evolved in non-passerine species, as well as sub-oscine and oscine passerines. Early scientific research had the mistletoe and mistletoebird mutually co-evolving with a high dependence on each other through their evolutionary development. As the mistletoe has been in Australia for a long time and mistletoebirds for a relatively short time, the mistletoe seed was distributed originally by non-specialized frugivore birds like the honeyeater. Even though the mistletoebird has evolved into a very efficient local distributor of mistletoe seeds, the mistletoebird needs the mistletoe but the mistletoe does not need the mistletoebird.

Molecular-based scientific methods have been used recently to evaluate generic taxonomy within the flowerpecker family. The flowerpecker genetic subdivision is based on a single morphological character - the length of the outermost primary wing feather. Most flowerpeckers are sexually dichromatic, have stouter bills than sunbirds and display a broad variety of tongue structure. Genetic analysis of mitochondrial DNA of 70% of flowerpecker species showed that the mistletoebird and the red-capped flowerpecker (D. geelvinkianum) to be each other's closest relative.

The specific epithet hirundinaceum derives from the name of the swallow (Hirundo) and refers to its long and pointed swallow-like wings.

=== Subspecies ===
There are three recognised subspecies, which differ in geographical location and plumage details, primarily of the males:

- Dicaeum hirundinaceum hirundinaceum Shaw & Nodder, 1792—Australia (extensive red on throat and chest; flanks grey)
- Dicaeum hirundinaceum ignicolle G. R. Gray, 1858—Aru Islands, Indonesia (flanks yellow-buff)

The pink-breasted flowerpecker (Dicaeum keiense) was formerly considered as a subspecies.

== Description ==
The mistletoebird is small, 9–10 cm (3.5–3.9 in) long and 7.5–11 g (0.26–0.39 oz) weight. The male is glossy blue-black above, with a red chest and a slight red under-tail, and a black centre stripe running down its white belly. The female is dark grey above, with a white throat, light grey underparts, and just a touch of pinkish-red under the tail. The eyes, bill, and legs are black; the bill is just over a centimetre long, slender, slightly down-curved and sharply pointed. Immature birds are similar to the female, but have an orange-pink bill instead of black. There is a variance in size and colour across their distribution. The adult mistletoebird is smaller in the north of its distribution and females in the north have lighter coloured underparts compared to darker ones in the south.

The mistletoebird has long pointed wings and a short square tail with a slight notch at the tip. They usually occur singularly or in twos but occasionally in small family groups or flocks and very occasionally in mixed-species flocks when food is in abundance. Their flight is swift and they are usually seen flying above or high in the tree canopy on distinctively pointed wings. Their posture is usually upright when perched but adopt a more horizontal, swaying posture when alarmed. They have a variety of vocalizations but their most familiar is a short, sharp, high-pitched tzew or dzee whistled mainly on the wing. Songs while perched include a whistled wissweet wissweet uttered repeatedly. The male mistletoe bird can be mistaken for a scarlet robin (Petroica boodang) or flame robin (Petroica phoenicea), but it has no spot on the forehead and has a black streak on the white belly. Due to the combination of size, shape, behaviour, and plumage the mistletoebird is unlikely to be mistaken for any other Australian passerine; however, the pardalote and thornbill are the closest in size and shape.

== Behaviour ==
=== Habitat ===
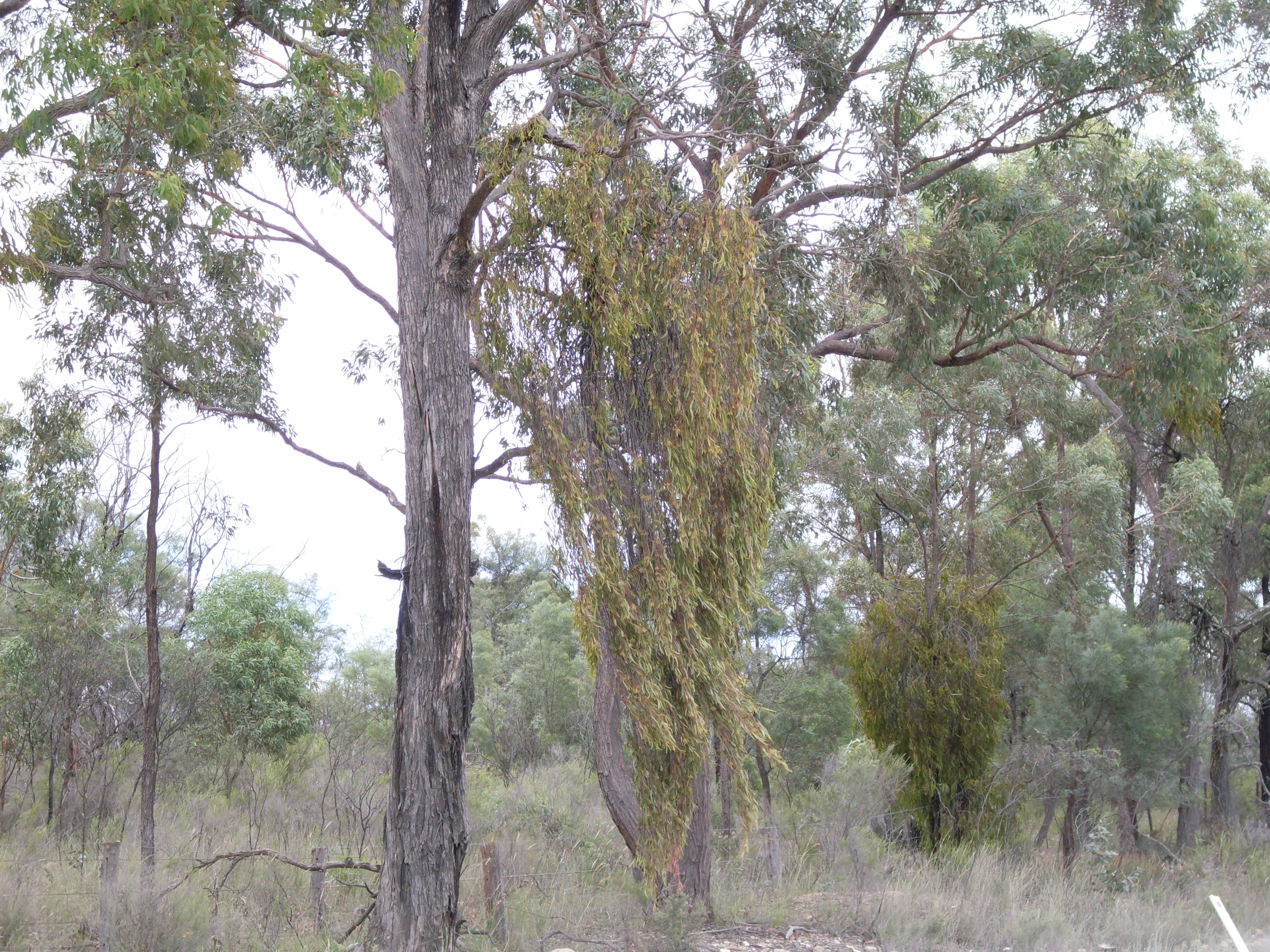
Mistletoe in Eucalyptus woodland. Central New South Wales.

Mistletoebirds are nomadic where movement is generally local and is associated with the fruiting of mistletoe. Mistletoebirds mostly occur in forests and woodlands dominated by any species of Eucalyptus from the dry interior to the coastal rain forests, but they do not frequent high altitude areas in winter as they adopt a torpid state when cold. Mistletoebirds are more likely to occur in mature stands where trees are larger and more likely to have become infested with mistletoe, rather than in regenerated areas. There are over 1300 species of mistletoe around the world and about 100 in Australia, where a common variety in the drier climates is the grey mistletoe (Amyema quandang). All mistletoes share a common growth form where water and nutrients are obtained from their host tree via a specialized vascular attachment, but as mistletoe manufacture their own carbohydrates using photosynthesis, they are referred to as 'half parasitic'. Although common on the mainland of Australia, there are no mistletoes in Tasmania.

Less specialized fruit-eating species, such as the honeyeater, source much of their protein from arthropods. To source the arthropods, the honeyeaters venture far and, therefore, are a conduit for long distance mistletoe seed dispersal, while the mistletoebirds generally concentrate on and limit their feeding to local mistletoe infestations.

Recent ecological studies have found the mistletoe producing a rich biodiversity in areas where it proliferates. The litter-fall under mistletoe infestation, where there is a high turnover of rich mistletoe leaves, has a diverse animal and plant life. Also, the denseness of the mistletoe bush and the characteristics of its leaves makes it a cool and safe place for birds to rest, hide, and nest. In a recent study in southern Australia, 217 species of Australian arboreal birds were reported nesting in mistletoe, including the mistletoebird.

=== Feeding ===
The mistletoebird is a specialist frugivore that primarily eats the berries of mistletoes. Foraging time takes up 25% of the mistletoebird's daytime activities in summer and 29% in winter. The increased fruit consumption in winter could be related to the bird's increased thermo-regulatory costs during the cold of winter. Mistletoe fruit dominates the mistletoebird's diet, accounting for 85% of foraging observations. Arthropods formed 13% and the remainder was from nectar, insects, and other berries. The only other known frugivore with a similar degree of dietary specialization is Pesquet's parrot (or vulturine parrot) of New Guinea that feeds almost exclusively on strangler figs. In becoming frugivore specialists, both these birds live off the fruit of parasites that germinate in the canopy of host trees, where the fruit of the parasite has specific seed placement requirements on host branches and resists consumption by frugivore nonspecialist birds. The mistletoe plant minimizes opportunistic consumption of their berries by less specialized dispersal birds by producing few, inconspicuous fruits over a long period. Specialist frugivorous birds, by eating mainly fruit, have a diet rich in carbohydrates and poor in protein. To increase the protein level, which is particularly important for reproduction and molting, the mistletoe bird has to eat large quantities of the mistletoe fruit.

=== Feeding adaptations ===
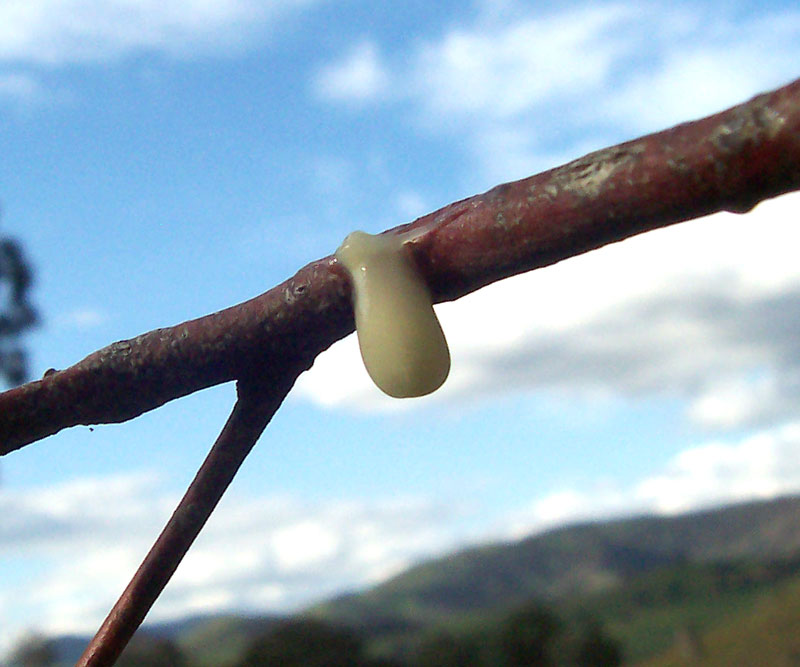
Deposited mistletoe seed. Sticky, to facilitate propagation in the host tree.

The mistletoebird has a small muscularized stomach and short alimentary canal, where the amount of mechanical grinding and chemical digestion is minimized. This enables a clear passage and quick exit of the mistletoe fruit seeds through the mistletoebird's digestive system. In comparison, the non-specialized fruit-eating birds that they compete with for the mistletoe berry, such as the spiny-cheeked honeyeater (Acanthagenys rufogularis), have a more complex digestive system that takes longer for the fruit seeds to pass, and in the process the seeds are subjected to more mechanical and chemical action in the gut. It takes between four and 25 minutes for the mistletoe seed to pass through the mistletoebird. In a scientific study in South Australia with the grey mistletoe (Amyema quandang), it took 2.3 times longer for the mistletoe seeds to pass through the digestive system of a spiny-cheeked honeyeater (A. rufogularis) than it did through the mistletoebird and five months after seed deposit, 43% more seedlings had established from seeds defecated by mistletoebirds than from seeds passed by the honeyeater. The mistletoebird's modified gastrointestinal tract is in the same plane. This facilitates rapid passage of the large number of berries consumed. Comparing the frugivore mistletoebird with a similarly sized insectivore the inland thornbill (Acanthiza inornata), where both their body masses are approximately 7 g (0.25 oz). The mean length of the gizzard in the mistletoebird is 4.3 mm (0.17 in) and 13.5 mm (0.53 in) in the thornbill. The mean length of the small intestine is 55 mm (2.2 in) in the mistletoebird and 88 mm (3.5 in) in the thornbill.

The mistletoebird has a large gape relative to the size of its head and its total body size. This allows grasping and swallowing the mistletoe fruit, which are about 12 mm (0.47 in) long by 7 mm (0.28 in) in diameter. These are large berries relative to the diminutive mistletoebird.

Efficiency of mistletoe fruit dispersal by the mistletoebird is increased by the way the bird perches on a branch to defecate. They sometimes stand facing along the host tree branch depositing seeds in a string on the perch. Honeyeater-dispersed seeds, in contrast, fall randomly and less efficiently onto substrates below the defecating bird. The texture of the defecated seed with the mistletoebird is stickier than other bird's feces to facilitate a strong bond with the host tree branch.

=== Breeding ===
Mistletoebirds conduct elaborate courtship and nuptial displays where, with a horizontal body, the male sways from side to side fluttering its wings, flicking its tail and displaying flashes of red. The female flies to a nearby branch where she flutters her wings. The male flies to her, mates and immediately they depart together. Mistletoebird pairs nest solitarily and raise up to 3 broods per season. The breeding season is from August to April depending where in Australia, but usually coincides with the fruiting of mistletoe. The nest can be found in many different plants but especially in eucalyptus, mistletoe, and acacia trees where it is suspended from an outer twig or thin horizontal branch and concealed among foliage. The nest is pear shaped with a slit side entrance and is usually made of plant down, wool, spider webs and spider egg sacs. The outside of the nest is coated with dry plant material like leaves, bark and lichen. The nest is built by the female, but accompanied by the male who assists very occasionally. Incubation is by the female but it has been recorded that males do sit the nest while the female is away. She will lay a clutch of three or four white eggs, each measuring 17 mm × 11 mm (0.67 in × 0.43 in), oval in shape. Incubation period is between 10 and 12 days and the young remain in the nest for approximately 15 days. The fledglings are fed by both parents but mainly by the female. Newly hatched birds are initially fed arthropods, after which mistletoe berry pulp is then gradually introduced into their diet. After about two weeks, when they are ready to fledge, the mistletoe berry pulp comprises 80% of food intake of the young mistletoebird. Both parents remove the fecal sacs left by the young in the nest.

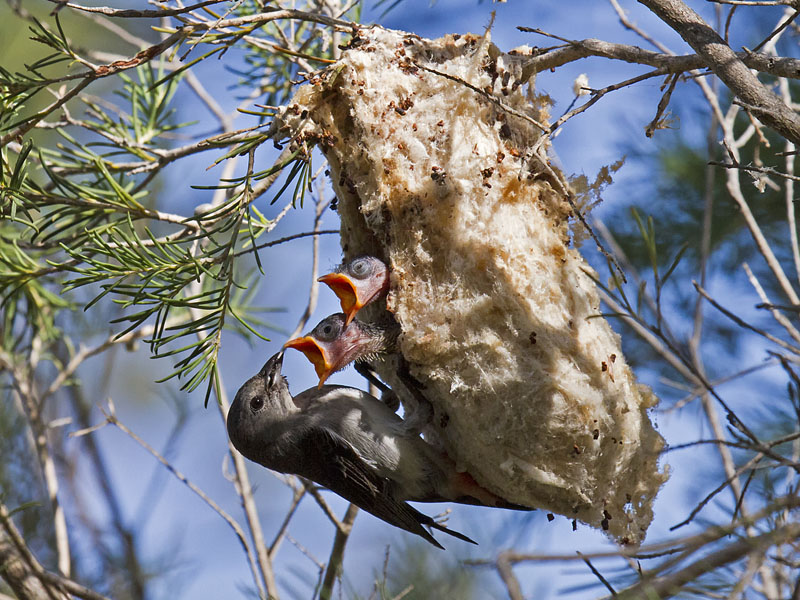
Female mistletoebird feeding young in a nest in southern Western Australia.

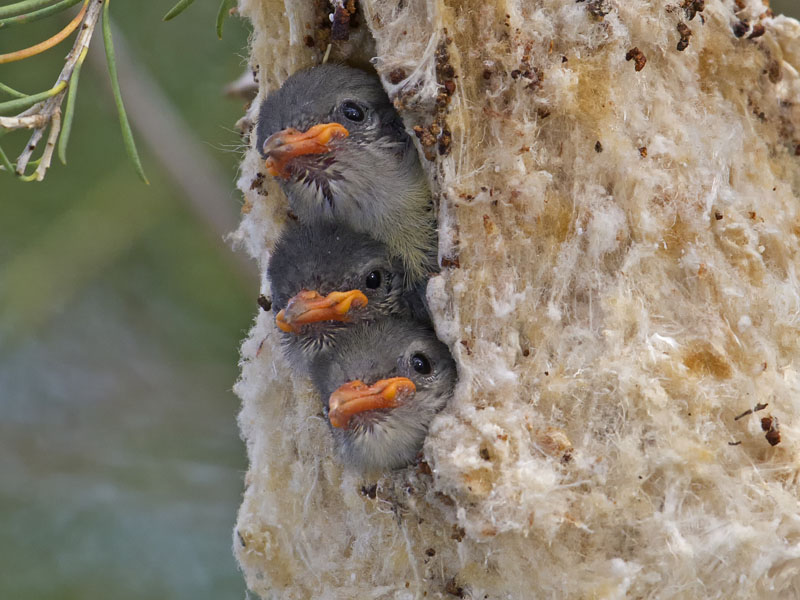
Three young mistletoebirds in their nest waiting to be fed.

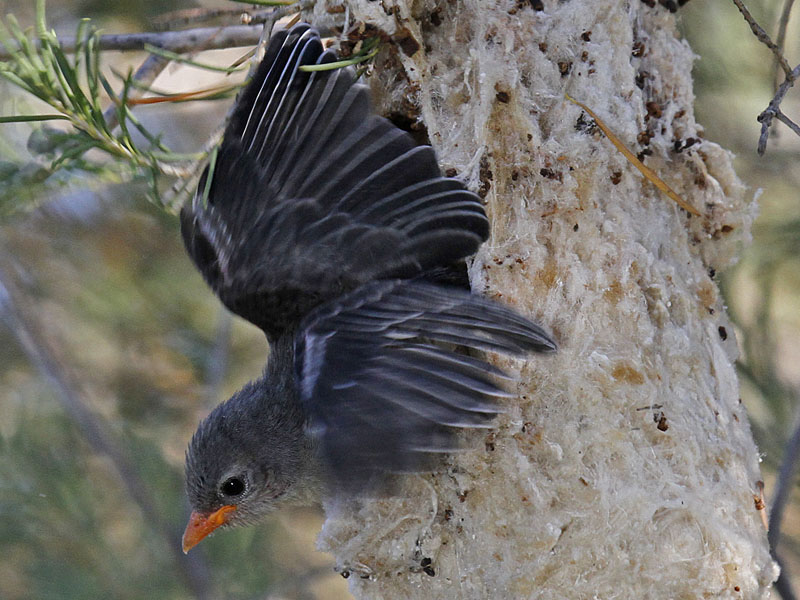
Fledgling leaving its nest for the first time.

=== Other characteristics ===
The longevity of a mistletoebird has been recorded in southern Queensland, where a banded adult male was recaptured near the banding site after nine years. Mistletoebirds vocally mimic other birds. Heard in all seasons and given by both sexes, they have been recorded mimicking the mulga parrot (Psephotus varius), as well as more than 25 different species of passerines. Predators known to have taken mistletoebird nestlings are the grey shrike-thrush (Colluricincla harmonica), pied butcherbird (Cracticus nigrogularis), pied currawong (Strepera graculina), and the Australian raven (Corvus coronoides). Nests have also been parasitized by a number of cuckoo species, including Horsfield's bronze-cuckoo (Chrysococcyx basalis) and the fan-tailed cuckoo (Cacomantis flabelliformis).

== Threats and human interaction ==
There was an ecological balance between the parasitic mistletoe and their host trees before this balance was disturbed with excessive forest clearing. Land clearing to accommodate farming practices and population growth created an imbalance that resulted in excessive infestations of mistletoe in some areas leading to forest degradation, and a total lack of mistletoe in other areas. Mistletoe density in Eucalyptus forests in Australia ranges from 0 to over 100 plants per hectare, where this high value is from highly damaged and perturbed habitat. From natural intact forests there are typically less than 10 plants per hectare. Avian richness increases with mistletoe density until a threshold of approximately 20 plants per hectare is reached after which heavy grazing and degradation sets in. Areas of excessive infestation of the parasite mistletoe badly damages or kills the host trees. The reaction to this was to try and eradicate the bird seen as spreading the parasite, the mistletoebird. One farmer in Australia in the 1930s claimed to have destroyed over 1200 mistletoebirds in a six-year period, but they are no longer actively persecuted.
