= Struthanthus lojae =

Conservation status
- Endangered (IUCN 3.1)

Scientific classification
- Kingdom: Plantae
- Clade: Tracheophytes
- Clade: Angiosperms
- Clade: Eudicots
- Order: Santalales
- Family: Loranthaceae
- Genus: Struthanthus
- Species: S. lojae

Binomial name
- Struthanthus lojae Kujit

Species of mistletoe

Struthanthus lojae is a species of plant of the genus Struthanthus in the family Loranthaceae It is endemic to Ecuador. Its natural habitat is subtropical or tropical moist montane forests.
