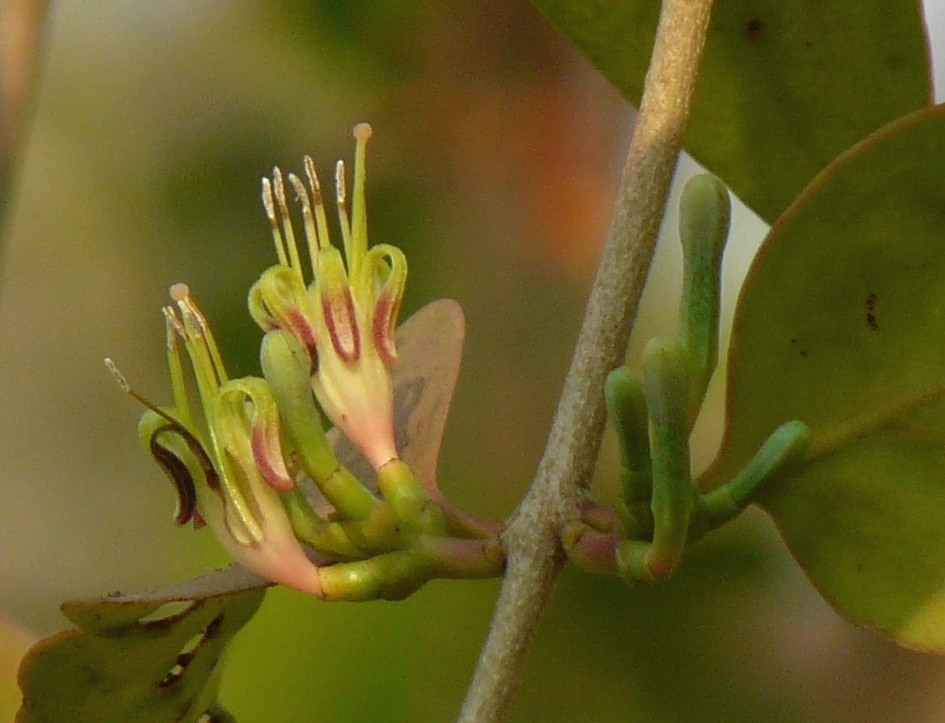
- Flowers of M. capitellatus

Scientific classification
- Kingdom: Plantae
- Clade: Tracheophytes
- Clade: Angiosperms
- Clade: Eudicots
- Order: Santalales
- Family: Loranthaceae
- Genus: Macrosolen; C. L. Blume (1830)

= Macrosolen =

Genus of mistletoes

Macrosolen is a genus of plants in the family Loranthaceae. It includes about 83 species all over the world with ca. 40 species widely distributed in tropical South and Southeast Asia. Some species were described by de Loureiro (1790, as Loranthus), Lecomte (1915, as Elytranthe), Danser (1938) and Hô (2003).

== Description ==
Macrosolen are parasitic shrubs.

== Taxonomy ==
The genus was described by Carl Ludwig Blume and published in Systema Vegetabilium 7(2): 1731. 1830. (Oct.-Dec. 1830)

=== Species ===
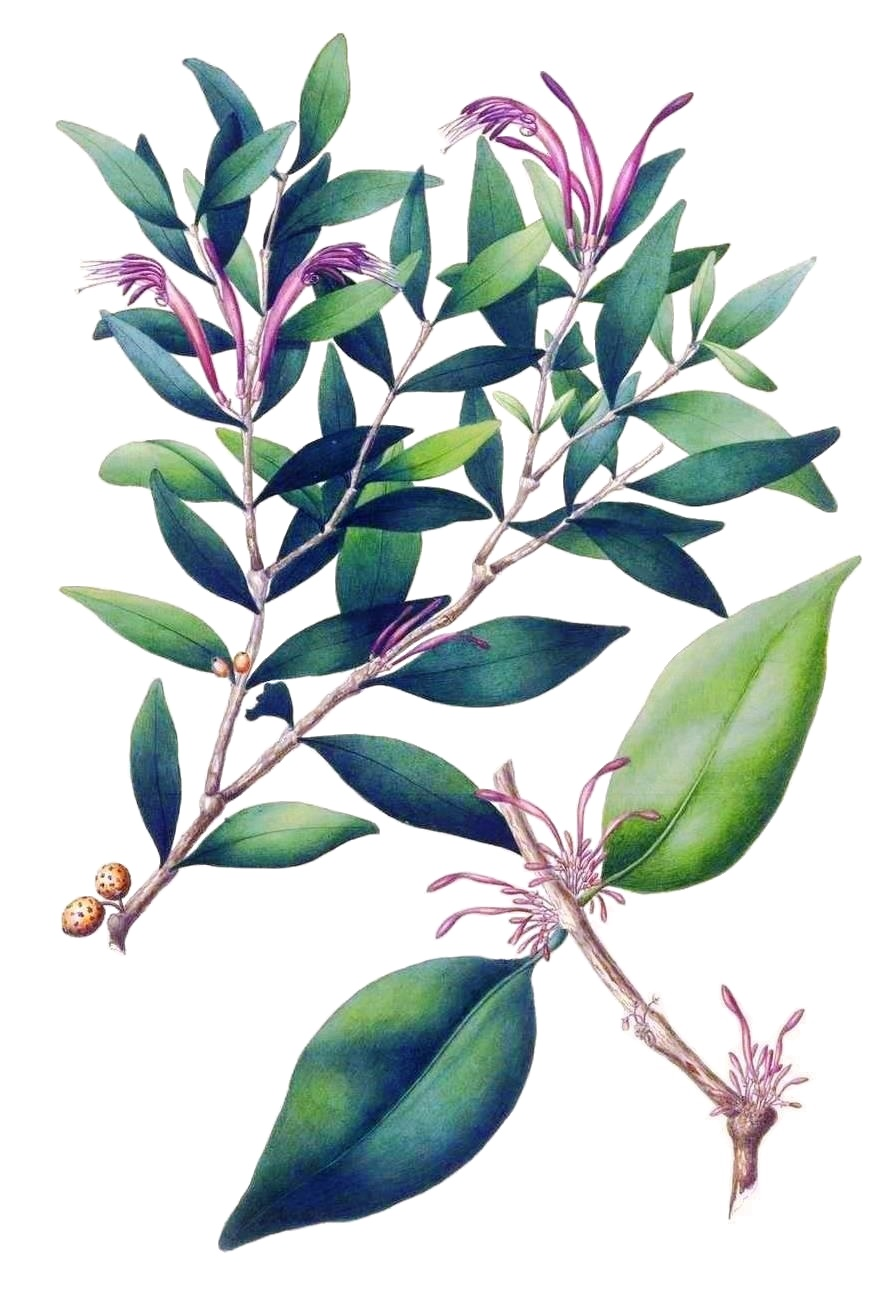
Loranthus evenius (= Macrosolen avenis)

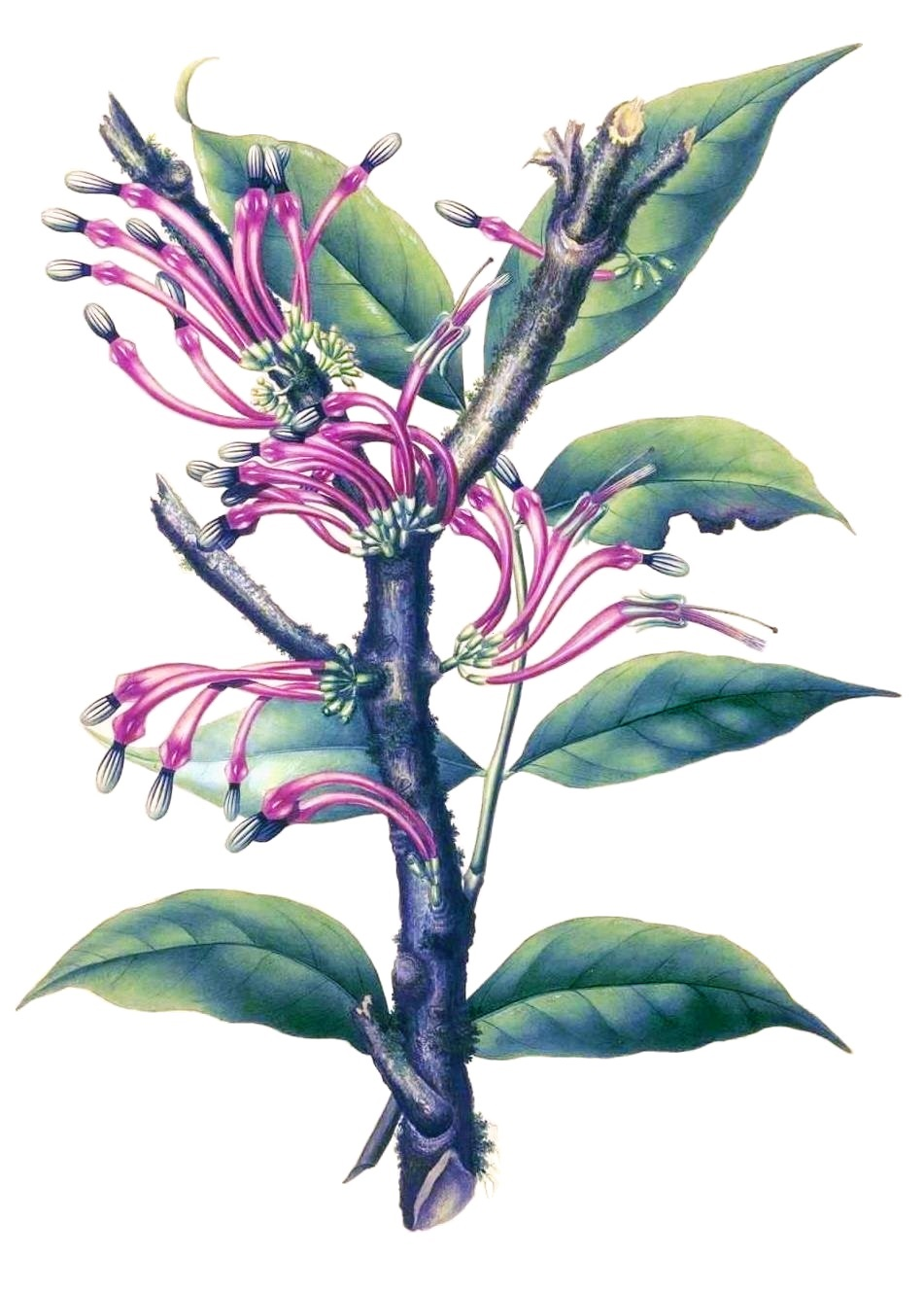
Macrosolen formosus

- Macrosolen acunae Danser
- Macrosolen albicaulis Wiens
- Macrosolen amboinensis Danser
- Macrosolen ampullaceus Blume
- Macrosolen ampullaceus (Roxb.) Tiegh.
- Macrosolen angulatus Danser
- Macrosolen annamicus Danser
- Macrosolen avenis Danser
- Macrosolen barlowii Wiens
- Macrosolen beccarii Tiegh. ex Becc.
- Macrosolen bellus Danser
- Macrosolen bibracteolatus (Hance) Danser
- Macrosolen bidoupensis (Shuichiro Tagane, Van Son Dang, Nguyen Van Ngoc, Hoang Thi Binh, Natsuki Komada, Jarearnsak Sae Wai, Akiyo Naiki, Hidetoshi Nagamasu, Hironori Toyama, Tetsukazu Yahara) 2017
- Macrosolen borneanus Danser
- Macrosolen brandisianus (Kurz) Tiegh.
- Macrosolen brevitubus Barlow
- Macrosolen capitellatus (Wight & Arn.) Danser
- Macrosolen carinatulus (Wall.) Tiegh.
- Macrosolen clavatus Blume
- Macrosolen cochinchinensis (Lour.) Tiegh.
- Macrosolen coriaceus Danser
- Macrosolen crassus Danser
- Macrosolen creatophyllus Miq.
- Macrosolen curtiflorus Danser
- Macrosolen curvinervis Danser
- Macrosolen demesae Danser
- Macrosolen dianthus Danser
- Macrosolen elasticus Blume
- Macrosolen evenius Miq.
- Macrosolen flammeus Danser
- Macrosolen floridus Danser
- Macrosolen fordii (Hance) Danser
- Macrosolen formosus (Blume) Miq. [Unplaced]
- Macrosolen geminatus (Merr.) Danser
- Macrosolen globosus (Roxb.) Tiegh.
- Macrosolen jackianus Miq.
- Macrosolen javanus Danser
- Macrosolen krempfii Danser
- Macrosolen kunstleri (King) Tiegh.
- Macrosolen latifolius Danser
- Macrosolen lowii (King) Tiegh.
- Macrosolen macgregorii Danser
- Macrosolen macrophyllus Miq.
- Macrosolen melintangensis Miq.
- Macrosolen nobilis Danser
- Macrosolen oleoides Miq.
- Macrosolen pallens Miq.
- Macrosolen papillosus Danser
- Macrosolen parasiticus (L.) Danser
- Macrosolen patulus Blume
- Macrosolen patulus (Jack) Miq.
- Macrosolen platyphyllus Danser
- Macrosolen pseudoglobosus Miq.
- Macrosolen pseudoperfoliatus Miq.
- Macrosolen psilanthus (Hook.f.) Danser
- Macrosolen pusillus Danser
- Macrosolen reinwardtianus Blume
- Macrosolen retusus Blume
- Macrosolen retusus Miq.
- Macrosolen robinsonii (Gamble) Danser
- Macrosolen rotundatus Miq.
- Macrosolen sphaerocarpus (Blume) Miq.
- Macrosolen sphaerocarpus Blume
- Macrosolen splendidus Danser
- Macrosolen suberosus (Lauterb.) Danser
- Macrosolen subsessilis Danser
- Macrosolen subumbellatus Blume
- Macrosolen subumbellatus (Blume) Tiegh.
- Macrosolen sumatranus Danser
- Macrosolen surigaoensis Danser
- Macrosolen tenuiflorus Danser
- Macrosolen tetragonus Blume
- Macrosolen tetragonus (Blume) Miq.
- Macrosolen tomentosus Blume
- Macrosolen tribracteatus Danser
- Macrosolen tricolor (Lecomte) Danser
- Macrosolen trigonus (Wight & Arn.) Tiegh.
- Macrosolen tubiflorus (Ridl.) Danser
- Macrosolen urceolatus Danser
- Macrosolen viridiflorus (Wall.) Tiegh.
- Macrosolen viridiflorus Blume
- Macrosolen worcesteri Danser
- Macrosolen wrayi Danser
