= Thomas Archibald Sprague =

British botanist (1877–1958)

Thomas Archibald Sprague (7 October 1877, Edinburgh – 22 October 1958, Cheltenham, Gloucestershire, England) was a Scottish botanist. In 1938 he married botanist Mary Letitia Green, and together they authored several supplements to the Index Kewensis.

In 1954, botanist Balle (Simone Balle) published Spragueanella, which is a genus of flowering plants from Tropical Africa belonging to the family Loranthaceae.
