= Iolaus iturensis =

Conservation status
- Least Concern (IUCN 3.1)

Scientific classification
- Kingdom: Animalia
- Phylum: Arthropoda
- Class: Insecta
- Order: Lepidoptera
- Family: Lycaenidae
- Genus: Iolaus
- Species: I. iturensis

Binomial name
- Iolaus iturensis (Joicey & Talbot, 1921)

Synonyms
- Argiolaus silarus iturensis Joicey & Talbot, 1921; Iolaus (Argiolaus) iturensis

Species of butterfly

Iolaus iturensis, the Ituri sapphire, is a butterfly in the family Lycaenidae. It is found in the Democratic Republic of the Congo (Ituri, Lualaba and Shaba), Angola, western Tanzania, Uganda and western Kenya. The habitat consists of forests.

The larvae feed on Loranthus and Erianthemum species and Phragmanthera rufescens.
