= Ligaria =

Ligaria may refer to:

- Ligaria (mantis), a genus of mantises in the family Mantidae
- Ligaria (plant), a genus of plants in the family Loranthaceae
