= Alfred Moquin-Tandon =

French naturalist and doctor

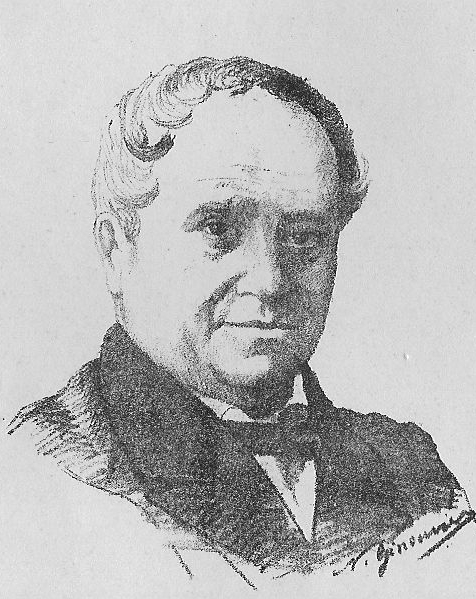
- Born: Christian Horace Benedict Alfred Moquin-Tandon; 7 May 1804; Montpellier
- Died: 15 April 1863 (aged 58); Paris
- Known for: L'Histoire Naturelle des Iles Canaries (1835–1844)
- Scientific career
- Fields: Naturalist, physician, ornithologist
- Workplaces: Marseille; botanical gardens, Toulouse; Jardin des Plantes, Paris; Académie des Sciences
- Author abbrev. (botany): Moq.
- Author abbrev. (zoology): Moquin-Tandon

Christian Horace Benedict Alfred Moquin-Tandon (7 May 1804 – 15 April 1863) was a French naturalist and medical doctor.

Moquin-Tandon was professor of zoology at Marseille from 1829 until 1833, when he was appointed professor of botany and director of the botanical gardens at Toulouse. In 1850, he was sent by the French government to Corsica to study the island's flora. In 1853, he moved to Paris, later becoming director of the Jardin des Plantes and the Académie des Sciences.

His books included the ornithology section of L'Histoire Naturelle des Iles Canaries (1835–44), co-authored with Philip Barker Webb and Sabin Berthelot.

One of his specialities was the family Amaranthaceae (The Amaranth family).

Several genera of plants have been named in his honour, including in 1838, DC. published Moquinia, a genus of flowering plants from Brazil, in the Moquinia tribe within the sunflower family. Then in 1954, Simone Balle published Moquiniella a genus of flowering plants from Africa, belonging to the family Loranthaceae. Lastly in 2013, botanists (Cabrera) G.Sancho published Moquiniastrum, a genus of flowering plants from South America, belonging to the family Asteraceae.

== Bibliography ==
- Ornithologie Canarienne in Webb & Berthelot's L'Histoire Naturelle des Iles Canaries (1835–44)
- Moquin-Tandon A. (1855–1856). Histoire naturelle des mollusques terrestres et fluviatiles de France, contenant des études générales sur leur anatomie et leur physiologie et la description particulière des genres, des espèces et des variétés. (4-5), 368 pp., J.-B. Baillière, Paris.
  - volume 1
  - volume 2
