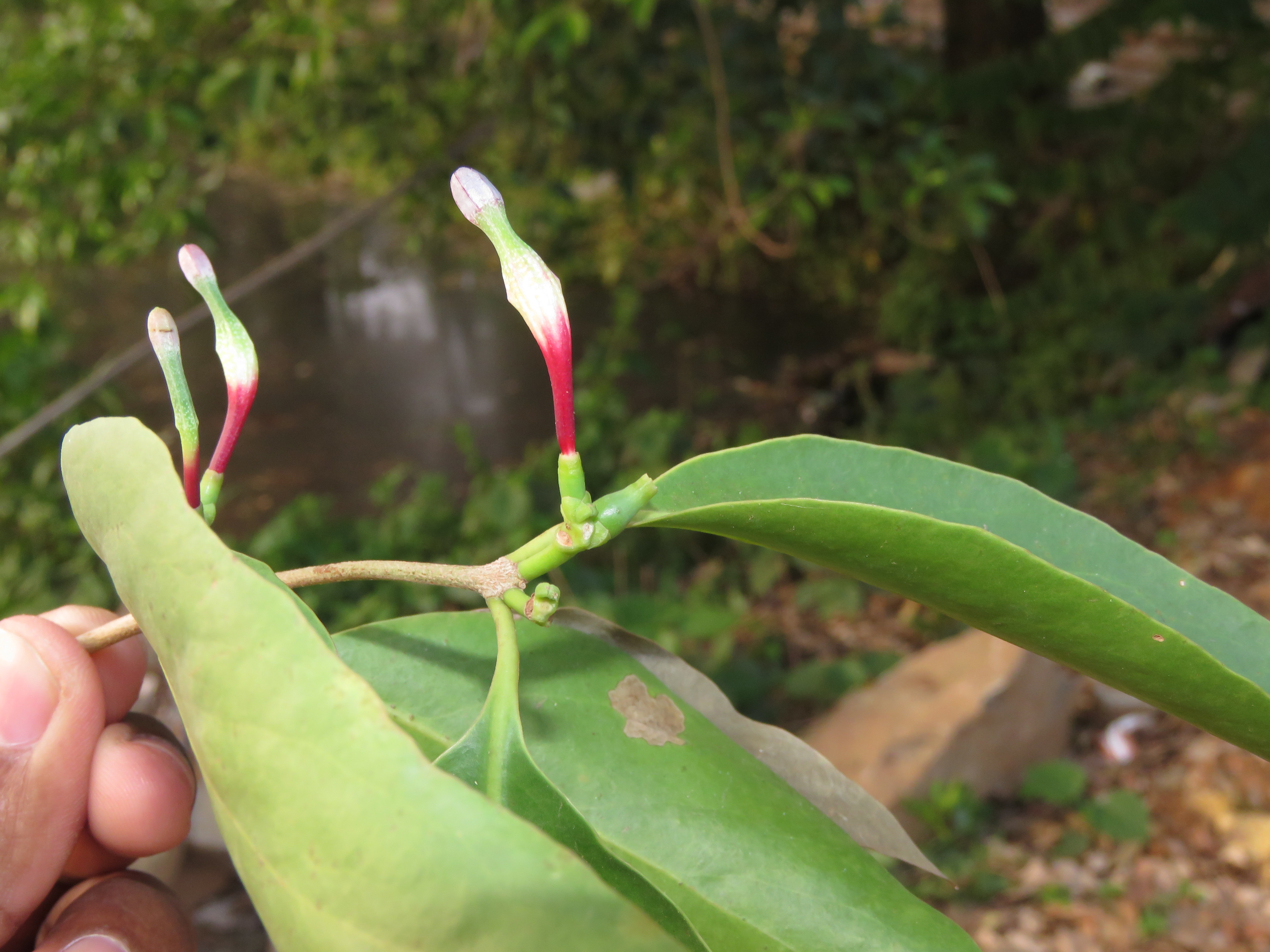
- At Thattekad in India

Scientific classification
- Kingdom: Plantae
- Clade: Embryophytes
- Clade: Tracheophytes
- Clade: Angiosperms
- Clade: Eudicots
- Order: Santalales
- Family: Loranthaceae
- Genus: Macrosolen
- Species: M. parasiticus

Binomial name
- Macrosolen parasiticus (L.) Danser

Synonyms
- Lonicera parasitica L.; Blumella loniceroides (L.) Tiegh.; Elytranthe lonicerioides (L.) G.Don; Elytranthe parasitica (L.) Danser; Iticania loniceroides Raf.; Loranthus loniceroides L.; Loranthus macrophyllus Zenker; Loranthus umbellatus B.Heyne; Tolypanthus loniceroides (L.) Blume

= Macrosolen parasiticus =

Species of flowering plant

Macrosolen parasiticus is a species of parasitic shrub in the family Loranthaceae. It is commonly called parasite honeysuckle. It is widely distributed in tropical South and South West Indian regions especially in the Western Ghats. Macrosolen parasiticus species were described by Danser (1938).

== Description ==
Macrosolen parasiticus is a parasitic shrub with thickened stem at nodes, like mistletoe. The oppositely arranged, ovate-lanceolate leaves have sharp tips and rounded bases. The leaf stalk (petiole) is 6–12 mm long. The flowers are few and stalkless. The peduncle carrying the spikes is up to 1 cm long. The flowers have a long, variegated, reddish flower tube, which is slightly curved. It has six, 5–6 mm long petals which are green and turned back. The fruit is an ovoid berry, green, with persistent sepals. Flowering and fruiting occurs from December to May.
