= Lepeostegeres cebuensis =

Scientific classification
- Kingdom: Plantae
- Clade: Tracheophytes
- Clade: Angiosperms
- Clade: Eudicots
- Order: Santalales
- Family: Loranthaceae
- Genus: Lepeostegeres
- Species: L. cebuensis

Binomial name
- Lepeostegeres cebuensis Barcelona, Nickrent & Pelser

Species of mistletoe

Lepeostegeres cebuensis is a species of mistletoe recently described which is found on Cebu Island, Philippines. Currently this is treated as an unplaced name by Plants of the world online.
