= Oryctanthus =

Scientific classification
- Kingdom: Plantae
- Clade: Tracheophytes
- Clade: Angiosperms
- Clade: Eudicots
- Order: Santalales
- Family: Loranthaceae
- Genus: Oryctanthus; Eichler

Genus of plants

Oryctanthus is a genus of flowering plants belonging to the family Loranthaceae.

Its native range is Mexico to Tropical America.

Species:

- Oryctanthus alveolatus (Kunth) Kuijt
- Oryctanthus asplundii Kuijt
- Oryctanthus callicarpus Kuijt
- Oryctanthus cordifolius (C.Presl) Urb.
- Oryctanthus costulatus Rizzini
- Oryctanthus florulentus (Rich.) Tiegh.
- Oryctanthus grammatus Kuijt
- Oryctanthus grandis Kuijt
- Oryctanthus guianensis Kuijt
- Oryctanthus minor Kuijt
- Oryctanthus neurophyllus Kuijt
- Oryctanthus occidentalis (L.) Eichler
- Oryctanthus ovalifolius (Ruiz & Pav.) J.F.Macbr.
- Oryctanthus pedunculatus (Kuijt) Rizzini
- Oryctanthus phthirusoides Rizzini
- Oryctanthus spicatus (Jacq.) Eichler
- Oryctanthus tehuacanensis (Oliv.) Engl.
