= Maracanthus =

Scientific classification
- Kingdom: Plantae
- Clade: Tracheophytes
- Clade: Angiosperms
- Clade: Eudicots
- Order: Santalales
- Family: Loranthaceae
- Genus: Maracanthus; Kuijt

Genus of plants

Maracanthus is a genus of flowering plants belonging to the family Loranthaceae.

Its native range is Costa Rica to Venezuela.

Species:

- Maracanthus badilloi (G.Ferrari) Kuijt
- Maracanthus chlamydatus (Rizzini) Kuijt
- Maracanthus costaricensis (Kuijt) Kuijt
