= Lampas elmeri =

Scientific classification
- Kingdom: Plantae
- Clade: Tracheophytes
- Clade: Angiosperms
- Clade: Eudicots
- Order: Santalales
- Family: Loranthaceae
- Genus: Lampas; Danser
- Species: L. elmeri

Binomial name
- Lampas elmeri Danser

Species of mistletoe

Lampas elmeri is a species of showy mistletoe endemic to Borneo, in the monotypic genus Lampas. It was described by Danser in 1929.
