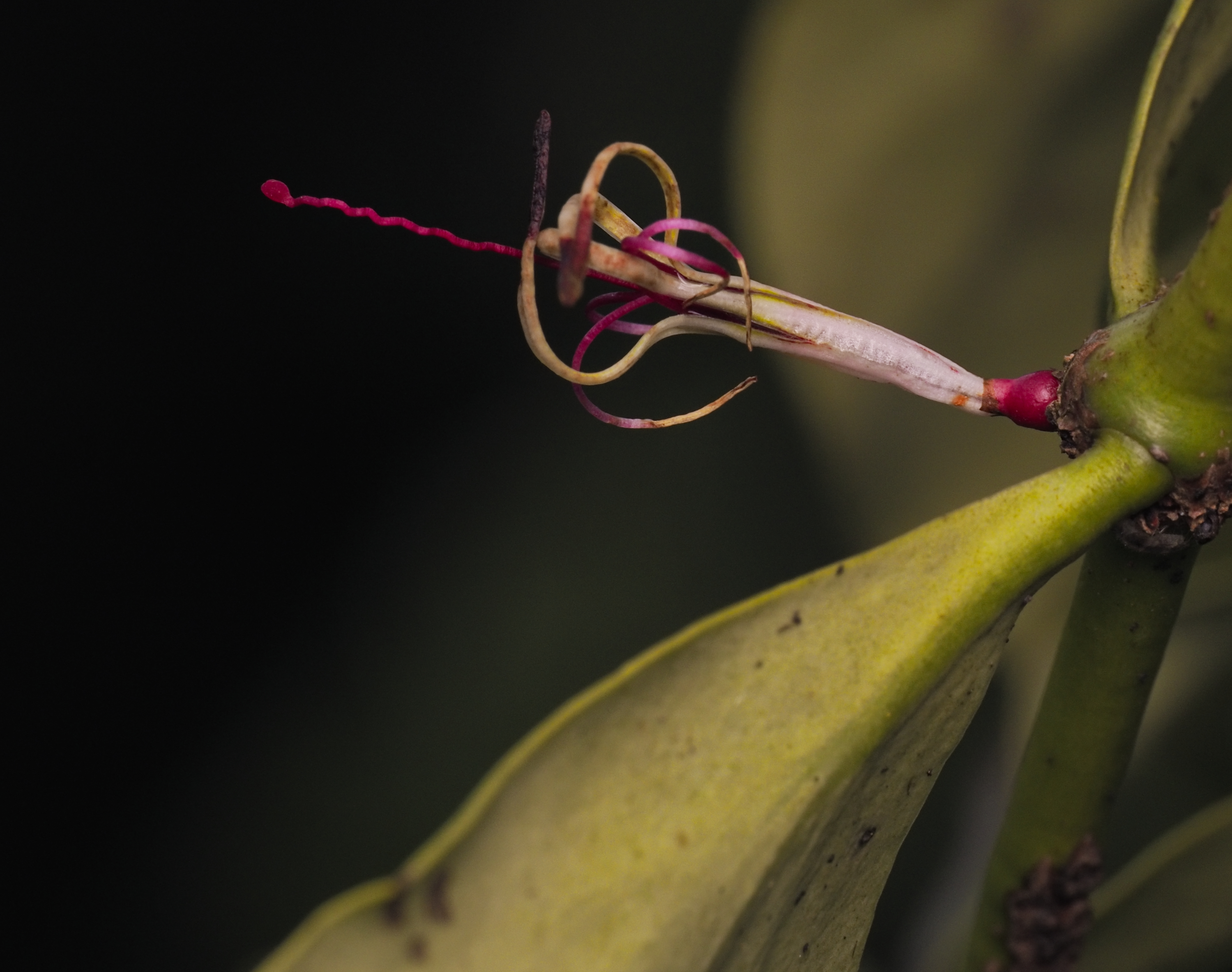
- Flower

Scientific classification
- Kingdom: Plantae
- Clade: Tracheophytes
- Clade: Angiosperms
- Clade: Eudicots
- Order: Santalales
- Family: Loranthaceae
- Genus: Helicanthes; Danser
- Species: H. elastica

Binomial name
- Helicanthes elastica (Desr.) Danser

= Helicanthes =

Genus of plants

Helicanthes is a monotypic genus of flowering plants belonging to the family Loranthaceae. The only species is Helicanthes elastica.

Its native range is India.
