= Loxanthera =

Scientific classification
- Kingdom: Plantae
- Clade: Tracheophytes
- Clade: Angiosperms
- Clade: Eudicots
- Order: Santalales
- Family: Loranthaceae
- Genus: Loxanthera (Blume) Blume
- Species: L. speciosa

Binomial name
- Loxanthera speciosa Blume

Genus of plants

Loxanthera is a monotypic genus of flowering plants belonging to the family Loranthaceae. The only species is Loxanthera speciosa. Its native range is Western Malesia.
