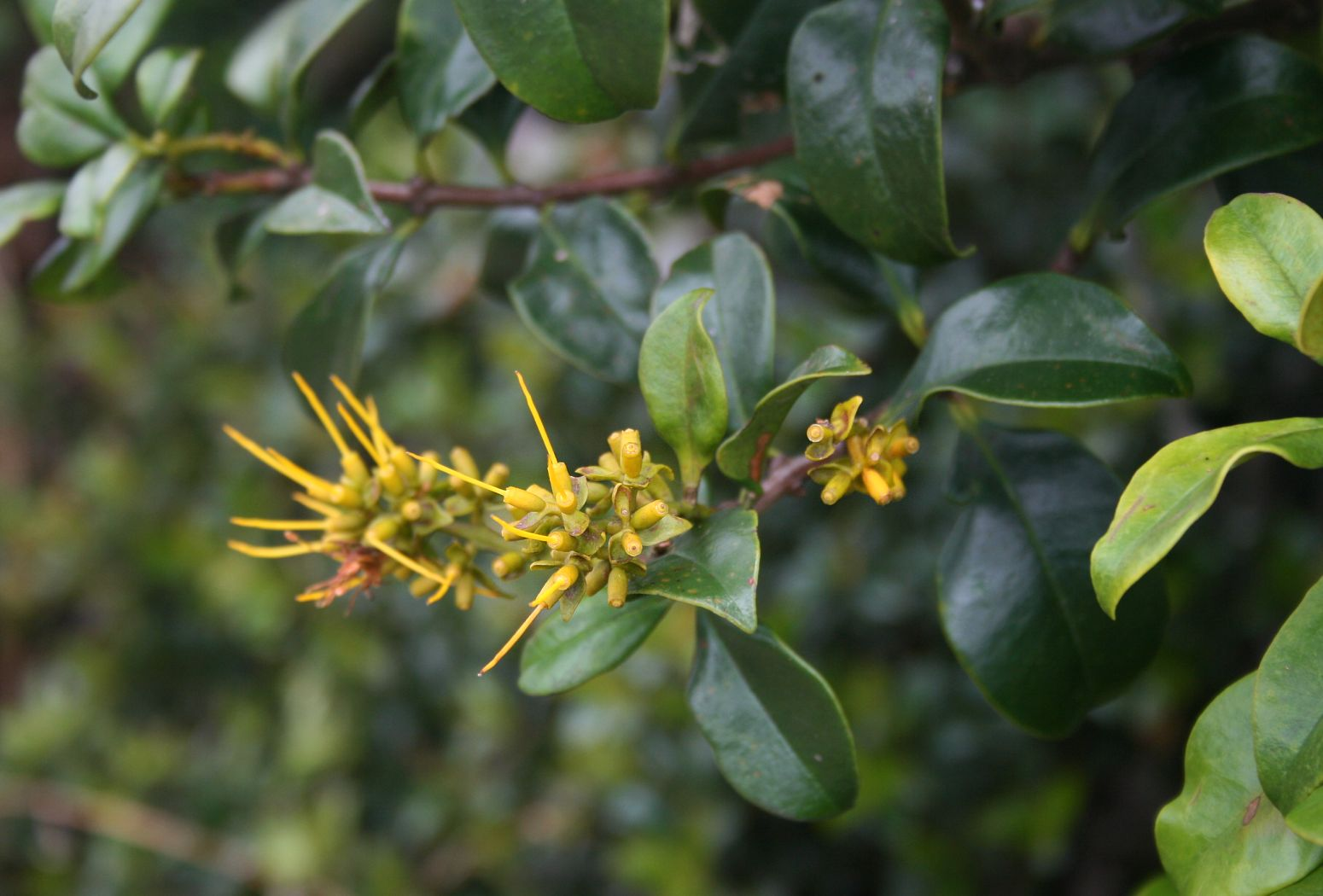

Conservation status
- Least Concern (IUCN 3.1)

Scientific classification
- Kingdom: Plantae
- Clade: Tracheophytes
- Clade: Angiosperms
- Clade: Eudicots
- Order: Santalales
- Family: Loranthaceae
- Genus: Gaiadendron; G.Don
- Species: G. punctatum

Binomial name
- Gaiadendron punctatum (Ruiz & Pav.) G.Don

Synonyms
- Loranthus punctatus Ruiz & Pav.; Phrygilanthus punctatus (Ruiz & Pav.) Eichler; Struthanthus punctatus (Ruiz & Pav.) Blume; Taguaria punctata (Ruiz & Pav.) Raf.; Gaiadendron breviflorum Hieron.; Gaiadendron ellipticum (Ruiz & Pav.) Baehni ex J.F.Macbr.; Gaiadendron lanceolatum (Ruiz & Pav.) Baehni ex J.F.Macbr.; Gaiadendron laurifolium (Kunth) G.Don; Gaiadendron macranthum Killip; Gaiadendron nitidum (Kunth) G.Don; Gaiadendron poasense Donn.Sm.; Gaiadendron punctatum var. puracense (Kunth) Steyerm.; Gaiadendron puracense (Kunth) G.Don; Gaiadendron revolutum Rizzini; Gaiadendron tagua (Kunth) G.Don; Gaiadendron tagua var. reductum Rizzini; Gaiadendron tagua var. revolutum (Rizzini) Rizzini; Loranthos taguum St.-Lag.; Loranthus arboreus Mutis ex DC.; Loranthus bracteatus Willd. ex DC.; Loranthus ellipticus Ruiz & Pav.; Loranthus lanceolatus Ruiz & Pav.; Loranthus lancifolius Poir. ex Schult. & Schult.f.; Loranthus laurifolius Kunth; Loranthus laurinus Willd. ex Schult. & Schult.f.; Loranthus nitidus Kunth; Loranthus obvallatus Schult. & Schult.f.; Loranthus puracensis Kunth; Loranthus tagua Kunth; Notanthera ellipticus G.Don; Notanthera lanceolatus (Ruiz & Pav.) G.Don; Phrygilanthus ellipticus (Ruiz & Pav.) Eichler; Phrygilanthus lanceolatus (Ruiz & Pav.) Eichler; Phrygilanthus puracensis (Kunth) Eichler; Phrygilanthus tagua (Kunth) Eichler; Struthanthus ellipticus Blume; Struthanthus lancifolius Blume; Struthanthus laurifolius (Kunth) Blume; Struthanthus nitidus Blume; Taguaria elliptica Raf.; Taguaria laurifolia (Kunth) Raf.; Taguaria nitida Raf.; Taguaria puracensis (Kunth) Raf.; Taguaria vera (Kunth) Raf.

= Gaiadendron =

Genus of mistletoes

Gaiadendron is a genus of parasitic shrubs or trees in the family Loranthaceae. It solely comprises the species Gaiadendron punctatum, which is found in North and South America.
