= Septemeranthus =

Scientific classification
- Kingdom: Plantae
- Clade: Tracheophytes
- Clade: Angiosperms
- Clade: Eudicots
- Order: Santalales
- Family: Loranthaceae
- Genus: Septemeranthus; L.J.Singh (2021)
- Species: S. nicobaricus

Binomial name
- Septemeranthus nicobaricus L.J.Singh (2021)

Genus of plants

Septemeranthus nicobaricus is a species of flowering plant in family Loranthaceae. It is endemic to the Nicobar Islands. It is a hemiparasitic branch epiphyte which grows on the host tree Horsfieldia glabra. It is the sole species in genus Septemeranthus.
