= Oedina =

Scientific classification
- Kingdom: Plantae
- Clade: Tracheophytes
- Clade: Angiosperms
- Clade: Eudicots
- Order: Santalales
- Family: Loranthaceae
- Genus: Oedina; Tiegh.

Genus of plants

Oedina is a genus of flowering plants belonging to the family Loranthaceae.

Its native range is Tanzania to Zambia.

Species:

- Oedina brevispicata Polhill & Wiens
- Oedina congdoniana Polhill & Wiens
- Oedina erecta Tiegh.
- Oedina pendens (Engl. & K.Krause) Polhill & Wiens
