= Vanwykia =

Scientific classification
- Kingdom: Plantae
- Clade: Tracheophytes
- Clade: Angiosperms
- Clade: Eudicots
- Order: Santalales
- Family: Loranthaceae
- Genus: Vanwykia; Wiens

Genus of flowering plants

Vanwykia is a genus of flowering plants belonging to the family Loranthaceae.

Its native range is Southern Africa and is found in the countries of Malawi, Mozambique, Tanzania, Zambia, Zimbabwe and the Northern Provinces within South Africa.

== Known species ==
As accepted by Kew:

- Vanwykia remota (Baker & Sprague) Wiens
- Vanwykia rubella Polhill & Wiens

The genus name of Vanwykia is in honour of Pieter van Wyck (1931–2006), a South African botanist and ecologist. It was first described and published in Bothalia Vol.12 on page 422 in 1978.
