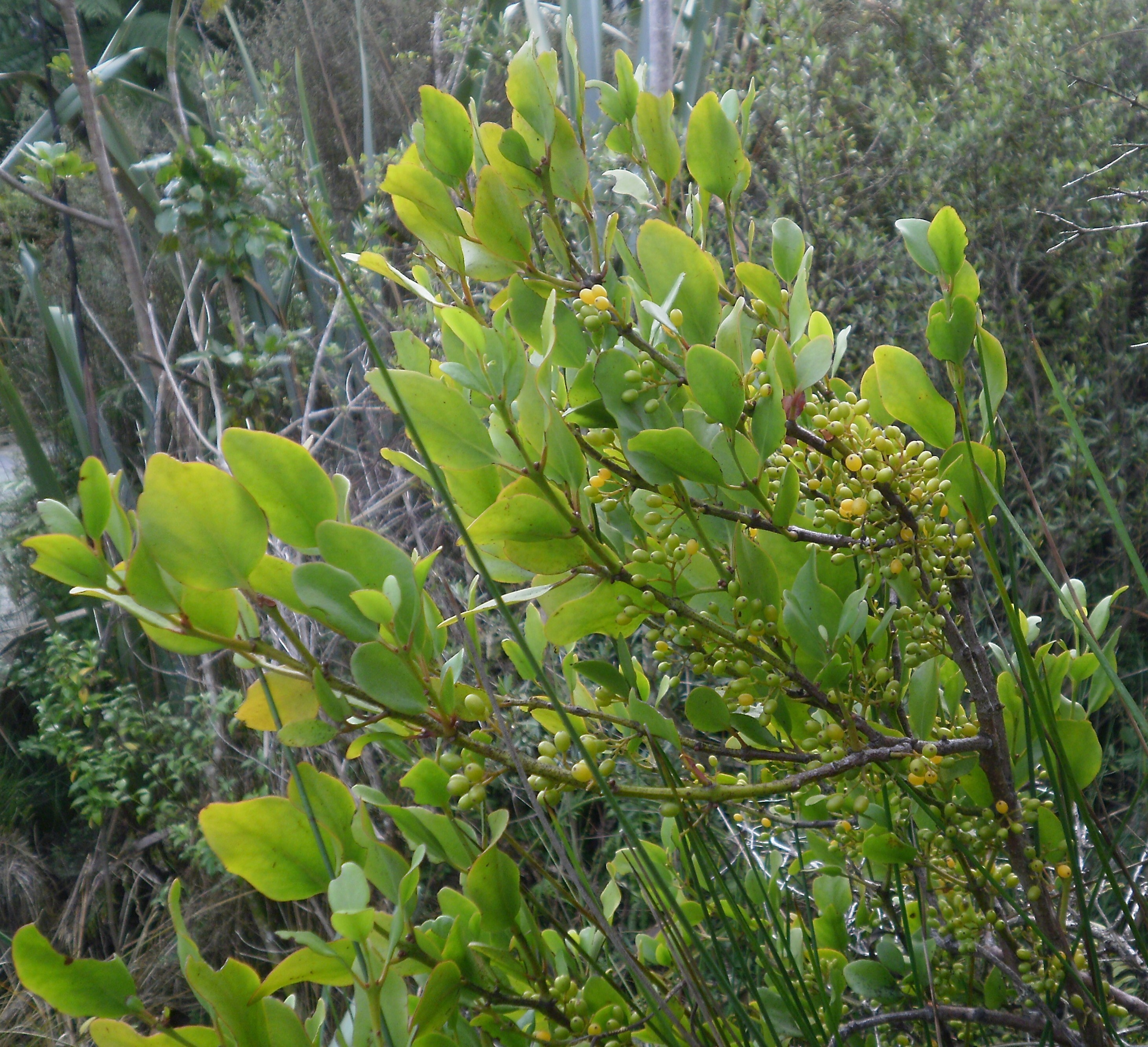
- Ileostylus micranthus

Scientific classification
- Kingdom: Plantae
- Clade: Tracheophytes
- Clade: Angiosperms
- Clade: Eudicots
- Order: Santalales
- Family: Loranthaceae
- Genus: Ileostylus; Tiegh.

= Ileostylus =

Genus of mistletoes

Ileostylus is a genus of mistletoes in the family Loranthaceae. One member of the genus is only found in New Zealand.

== Species list ==
- Ileostylus kirkii (Oliv.) Tiegh.
- Ileostylus micranthus Tiegh.
