= Papuanthes =

Scientific classification
- Kingdom: Plantae
- Clade: Tracheophytes
- Clade: Angiosperms
- Clade: Eudicots
- Order: Santalales
- Family: Loranthaceae
- Genus: Papuanthes; Danser
- Species: P. albertisii

Binomial name
- Papuanthes albertisii (Tiegh.) Danser

Genus of plants

Papuanthes is a monotypic genus of flowering plants belonging to the family Loranthaceae. The only species is Papuanthes albertisii.

Its native range is New Guinea.
