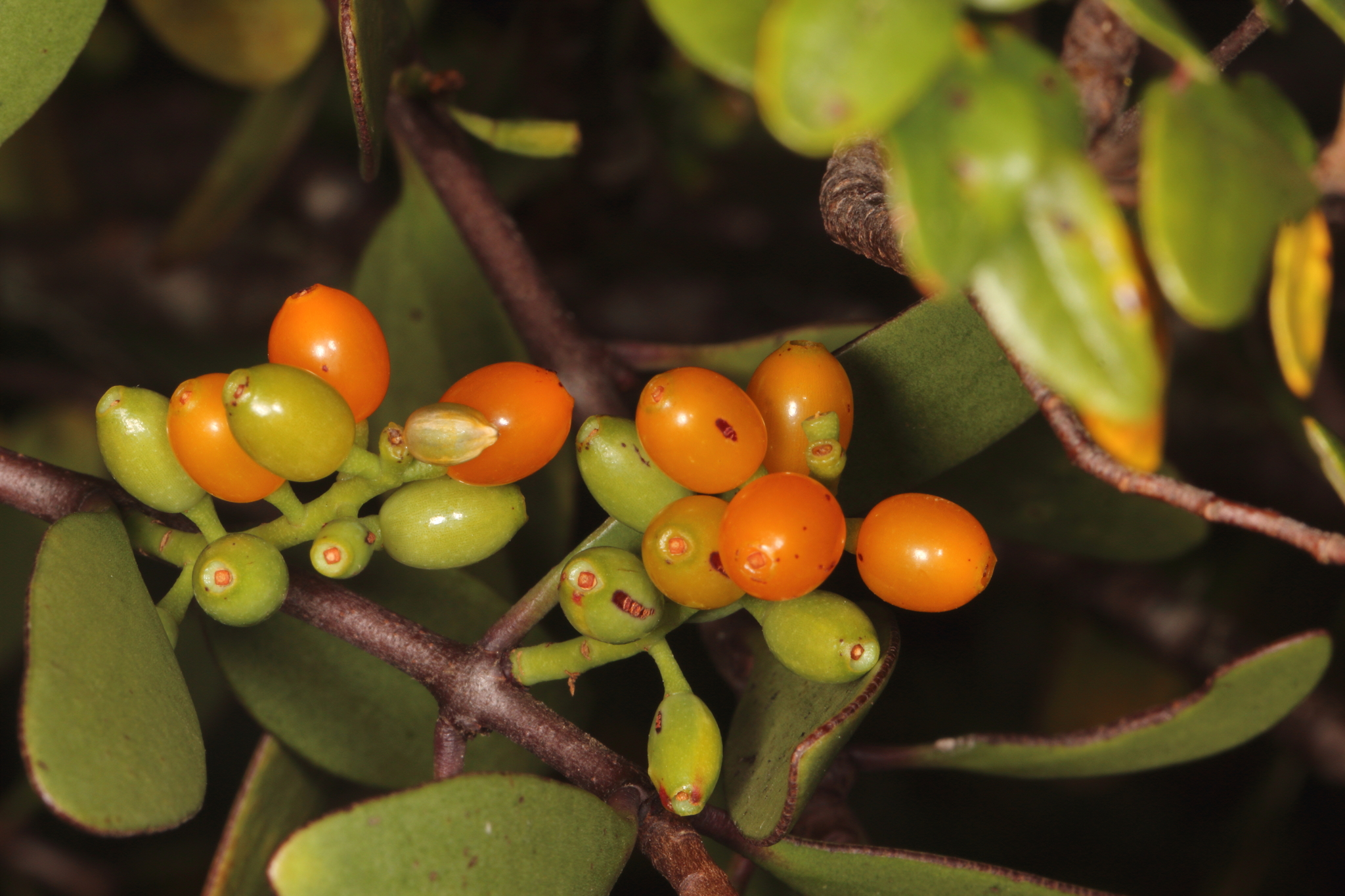

Conservation status
- Declining (NZ TCS)

Scientific classification
- Kingdom: Plantae
- Clade: Tracheophytes
- Clade: Angiosperms
- Clade: Eudicots
- Order: Santalales
- Family: Loranthaceae
- Genus: Alepis; Tiegh.
- Species: A. flavida

Binomial name
- Alepis flavida (Hook.f.) Tiegh.

= Alepis =

Genus of flowering plants

Alepis is a genus of flowering plants belonging to the family Loranthaceae. It is monotypic, being represented by the single species Alepis flavida.

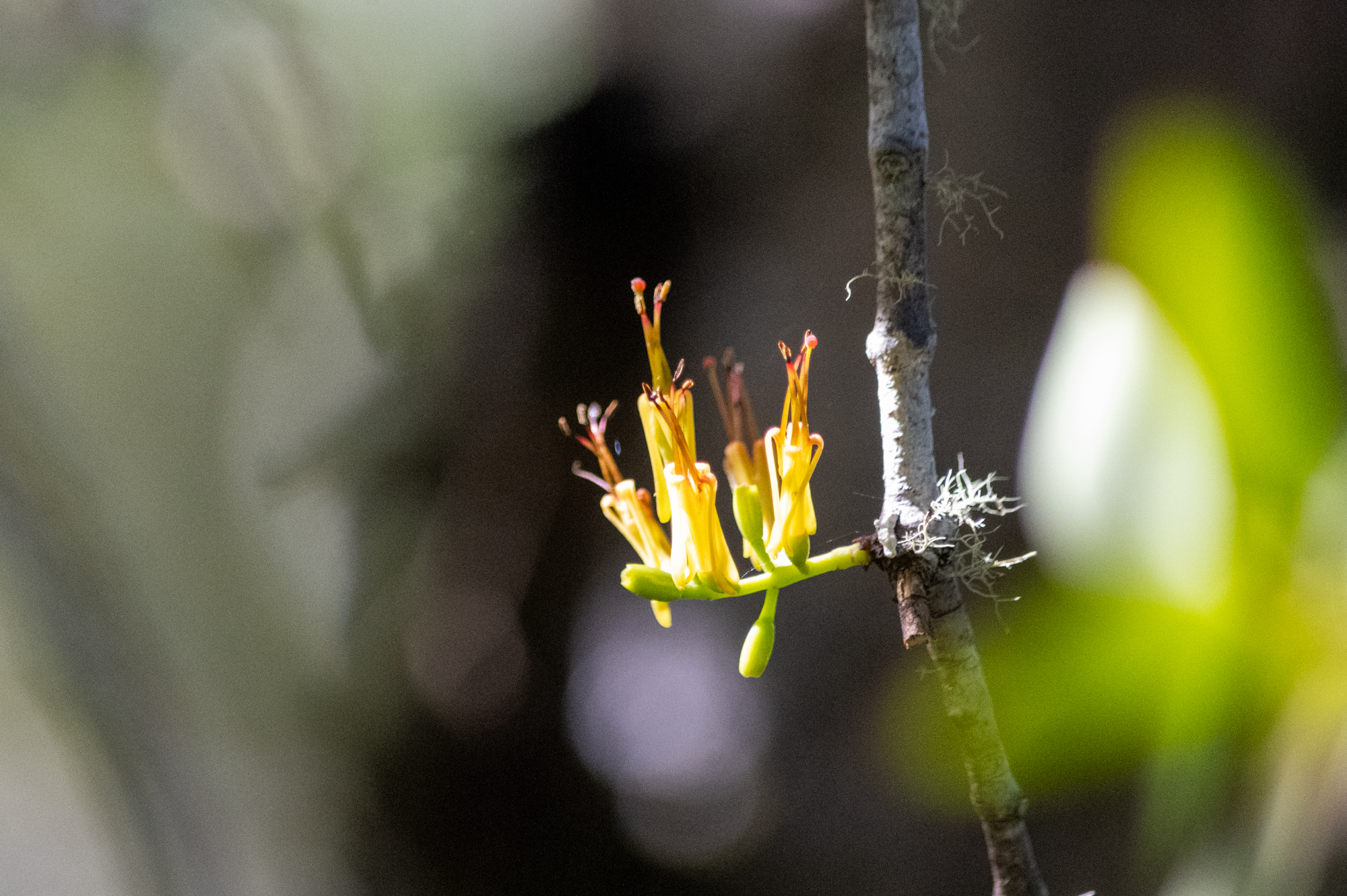
Flowers of the Alepis flavida

The mistletoe has yellow, erect flowers with tall orange anthers.

This mistletoe was first described in 1852 as Loranthus flavidus by Joseph Dalton Hooker, but in 1894 Philippe Édouard Léon Van Tieghem transferred it to the genus, Alepis.

Its native range is New Zealand.

== Conservation status ==
It is currently (2017) declared "At Risk - Declining" under the New Zealand Threatened species system, with the qualifier C(1) implying that there are greater than 10000 mature individuals with an expected decline of from 10% to 70%, and with an area of occupancy which is less than 10,000 ha which is expected to decline by from 10% to 50%.
