= Bakerella (plant) =

Scientific classification
- Kingdom: Plantae
- Clade: Tracheophytes
- Clade: Angiosperms
- Clade: Eudicots
- Order: Santalales
- Family: Loranthaceae
- Genus: Bakerella; Tiegh.

Genus of mistletoes

Bakerella is genus of sixteen showy mistletoe species in Madagascar and the Mascarenes. The genus was described in 1964 by the Belgian botanist Simone Balle in Flora de Madagascar. In Madagascar, Bakerella can be an important food source for lemurs.
