= Diplatia =

Scientific classification
- Kingdom: Plantae
- Clade: Tracheophytes
- Clade: Angiosperms
- Clade: Eudicots
- Order: Santalales
- Family: Loranthaceae
- Genus: Diplatia; Tiegh.

Genus of plants

Diplatia is a genus of flowering plants belonging to the family Loranthaceae.

Its native range is New Guinea, Australia.

Species:

- Diplatia furcata Barlow
- Diplatia grandibractea (F.Muell.) Tiegh.
- Diplatia tomentosa Barlow
