= Lepeostegeres =

Scientific classification
- Kingdom: Plantae
- Clade: Tracheophytes
- Clade: Angiosperms
- Clade: Eudicots
- Order: Santalales
- Family: Loranthaceae
- Genus: Lepeostegeres; Blume

Genus of plants

Lepeostegeres is a genus of flowering plants belonging to the family Loranthaceae.

Its native range is Malesia to New Guinea.

Species:

- Lepeostegeres acutibracteus Danser
- Lepeostegeres alveolatus (Tiegh.) Danser
- Lepeostegeres bahajensis (Korth.) Miq.
- Lepeostegeres beccarii (King) Gamble
- Lepeostegeres cebuensis Barcelona, Nickrent & Pelser
- Lepeostegeres centiflorus (Stapf) Tiegh.
- Lepeostegeres congestiflorus (Merr.) Merr.
- Lepeostegeres deciduus Barlow
- Lepeostegeres gemmiflorus (Blume) Blume
- Lepeostegeres lancifolius (Tiegh.) Danser
