= Notanthera =

Scientific classification
- Kingdom: Plantae
- Clade: Tracheophytes
- Clade: Angiosperms
- Clade: Eudicots
- Order: Santalales
- Family: Loranthaceae
- Genus: Notanthera; G.Don
- Species: N. heterophyllus

Binomial name
- Notanthera heterophyllus (Ruiz & Pav.) G.Don

Synonyms
- Loranthus heterophyllus Ruiz & Pav.; Phrygilanthus heterophyllus (Ruiz & Pav.) Eichler; Struthanthus heterophyllus (Ruiz & Pav.) Blume; Loranthus berteroi Hook. & Arn.; Loranthus buxifolius Cham.; Loranthus eschscholzianus Mart. ex Schult. & Schult.f.; Loranthus glaucus Gillies ex Hook.; Loranthus valdivianus Miq.; Loranthus venetus Bertero ex Hemsl.; Loxanthera eschscholzianus Blume; Notanthera buxifolius G.Don; Phrygilanthus berteroi Eichler; Psittacanthus berteroi G.Don; Psittacanthus eschscholzianus G.Don; Struthanthus buxifolius Blume; Struthanthus escholzianus Mart.

Genus of plants

Notanthera is a monotypic genus of flowering plants belonging to the family Loranthaceae. The only species is Notanthera heterophyllus.

Its native range is Juan Fernández Islands, Central and Southern Chile.
