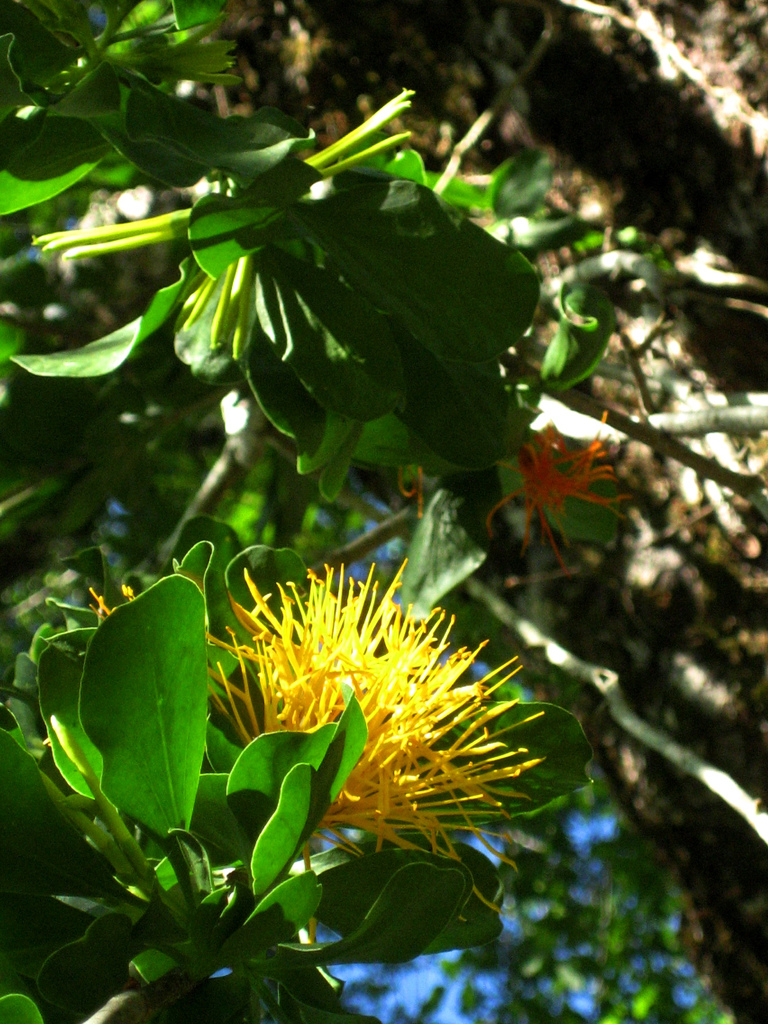
- Desmaria mutabilis

Scientific classification
- Kingdom: Plantae
- Clade: Tracheophytes
- Clade: Angiosperms
- Clade: Eudicots
- Order: Santalales
- Family: Loranthaceae
- Genus: Desmaria; Tiegh.
- Species: D. mutabilis

Binomial name
- Desmaria mutabilis (Poepp. & Endl.) Tiegh.

= Desmaria =

Genus of plants

Desmaria is a monotypic genus of flowering plants belonging to the family Loranthaceae. The only species is Desmaria mutabilis.

Its native range is Chile.
