= Trithecanthera =

Scientific classification
- Kingdom: Plantae
- Clade: Tracheophytes
- Clade: Angiosperms
- Clade: Eudicots
- Order: Santalales
- Family: Loranthaceae
- Genus: Trithecanthera; Tiegh.

Species
- Trithecanthera flava Kosterm.; Trithecanthera scortechinii (King) Danser; Trithecanthera sparsa Barlow; Trithecanthera superba Danser; Trithecanthera xiphostachya Tiegh.

Genus of mistletoes

Trithecanthera is a genus of showy mistletoes in the family Loranthaceae. It contains approximately 5 species in the Malesian region of South East Asia. The genus includes the species described within the genus Kingella as Kingella scortechinii.
