= Oncella =

Scientific classification
- Kingdom: Plantae
- Clade: Tracheophytes
- Clade: Angiosperms
- Clade: Eudicots
- Order: Santalales
- Family: Loranthaceae
- Genus: Oncella; Tiegh.

Genus of plants

Oncella is a genus of flowering plants belonging to the family Loranthaceae.

Its native range is Kenya to Mozambique.

Species:

- Oncella ambigua (Engl.) Tiegh.
- Oncella curviramea (Engl.) Danser
- Oncella gracilis Balle ex Polhill & Wiens
- Oncella schliebeniana Balle ex Polhill & Wiens
