= Pusillanthus =

Scientific classification
- Kingdom: Plantae
- Clade: Tracheophytes
- Clade: Angiosperms
- Clade: Eudicots
- Order: Santalales
- Family: Loranthaceae
- Genus: Pusillanthus; Kuijt

Genus of plants

Pusillanthus is a genus of flowering plants belonging to the family Loranthaceae.

Its native range is Venezuela, Northeastern Brazil.

Species:

- Pusillanthus pubescens (Rizzini) Caires
- Pusillanthus trichodes (Rizzini) Kuijt
