= Dactyliophora =

Scientific classification
- Kingdom: Plantae
- Clade: Tracheophytes
- Clade: Angiosperms
- Clade: Eudicots
- Order: Santalales
- Family: Loranthaceae
- Genus: Dactyliophora; Tiegh.

Genus of flowering plants

Dactyliophora is a genus of flowering plants belonging to the family Loranthaceae.

Its native range is Papuasia to Northern Queensland.

Species:

- Dactyliophora novaeguineae (F.M.Bailey) Danser
- Dactyliophora verticillata (Scheff.) Tiegh.
