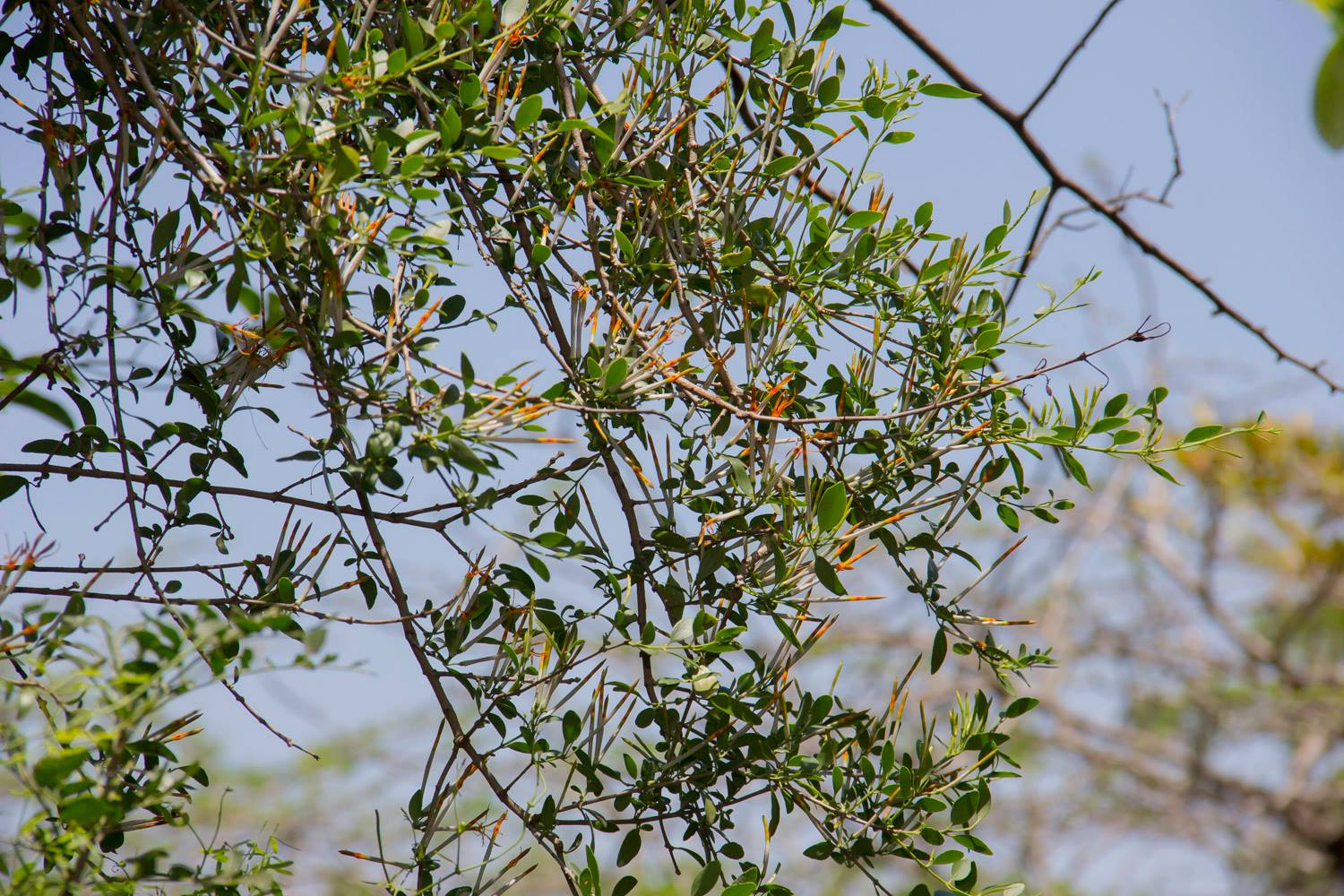
- Actinanthella wyliei

Scientific classification
- Kingdom: Plantae
- Clade: Tracheophytes
- Clade: Angiosperms
- Clade: Eudicots
- Order: Santalales
- Family: Loranthaceae
- Subtribe: Tapinanthinae
- Genus: Actinanthella; Balle

= Actinanthella =

Genus of mistletoes

Actinanthella is a small genus of hemiparasitic shrubs in the Loranthaceae family. They are found in Sub-Saharan Africa, specifically in Mozambique, Zambia, and Zimbabwe.

== Taxonomy ==
There are two species in the genus:

- Actinanthella menyharthii (Engl. & Schinz) Balle
- Actinanthella wyliei (Sprague) Wiens

== Description ==
The species in the genus are small hemiparasitic shrubs with simple or forked hairs and a single haustorial attachment. They have 1-3 flowers which are borne in the axils, and bracts are cup-shaped with a small limb. The petal structure is tubular below, with radially arranged lobes that first spread and are later reflexed. The tube itself has basal swelling, and is constricted and narrowly funnel-shaped above. The filaments are erect, with the upper part thickened and coiling at the ends. The berry of the plants are shaped narrowly obovoid.

== Ecology ==
The recorded host plants of Actinanthella are Erythroxylum, Boscia, and Olea.

Like several other African genera of hemiparasitic shrubs, Actinanthella is extremely specialized for pollination. Not only do their petals change coloration once mature to attract pollinators, but their corollas also split to form an opening through which sunbirds can insert their beaks. When that happens, a rapid response triggers, opening the flower and depositing pollen on the pollinator's head.
