= Pedistylis =

Scientific classification
- Kingdom: Plantae
- Clade: Tracheophytes
- Clade: Angiosperms
- Clade: Eudicots
- Order: Santalales
- Family: Loranthaceae
- Genus: Pedistylis; Wiens

Genus of plants

Pedistylis is a genus of flowering plants belonging to the family Loranthaceae.

Its native range is Southern Tropical and Southern Africa.

== Species ==
Species:

- Pedistylis galpinii (Schinz ex Sprague) Wiens
