= Oryctina =

Scientific classification
- Kingdom: Plantae
- Clade: Tracheophytes
- Clade: Angiosperms
- Clade: Eudicots
- Order: Santalales
- Family: Loranthaceae
- Genus: Oryctina; Tiegh.

Genus of plants

Oryctina is a genus of flowering plants belonging to the family Loranthaceae.

Its native range is Brazil.

Species:

- Oryctina eubrachioides Kuijt
- Oryctina quadrangularis Kuijt
- Oryctina scabrida (Eichler) Tiegh.
- Oryctina subaphylla Rizzini
