= Loranthella =

Scientific classification
- Kingdom: Plantae
- Clade: Tracheophytes
- Clade: Angiosperms
- Clade: Eudicots
- Order: Santalales
- Family: Loranthaceae
- Genus: Loranthella; S.Blanco & C.E.Wetzel (2016)
- Species: L. deflersii

Binomial name
- Loranthella deflersii (Tiegh.) S.Blanco & C.E.Wetzel (2016)

Synonyms
- Odontella Tiegh. (1895), nom. illeg.; Loranthella schimperi (Hochst. ex A.Rich.) S.Blanco & C.E.Wetzel (2016), not validly publ.; Loranthus schimperi Hochst. ex A.Rich. (1848); Loranthus schimperi var. parviflorus Hutch. & E.A.Bruce (1941); Odontella deflersii Tiegh. (1895); Odontella schimperi (Hochst. ex A.Rich.) Tiegh. (1895); Oncocalyx schimperi (Hochst. ex A.Rich.) M.G.Gilbert (1985); Tapinanthus schimperi (Hochst. ex A.Rich.) Danser (1933)

Genus of flowering plants

Loranthella deflersii is a species of flowering plant in family Loranthaceae. It is a hemiparasitic epiphyte native to deserts and dry shrublands of the Arabian Peninsula (Oman, Yemen, and Saudi Arabia) and the Horn of Africa (Djibouti, Eritrea, Ethiopia, and Somalia). It is the sole species in genus Loranthella.
