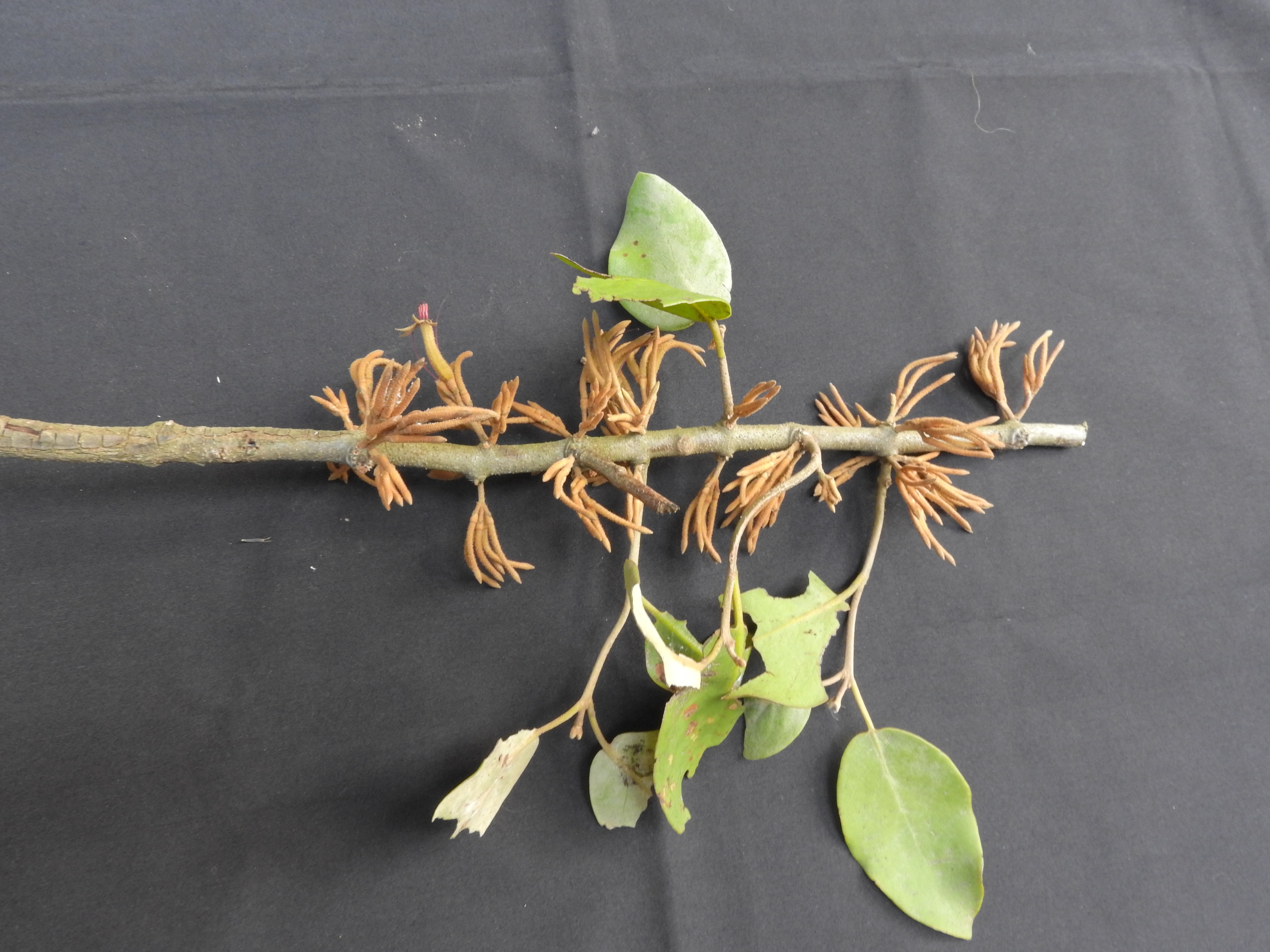

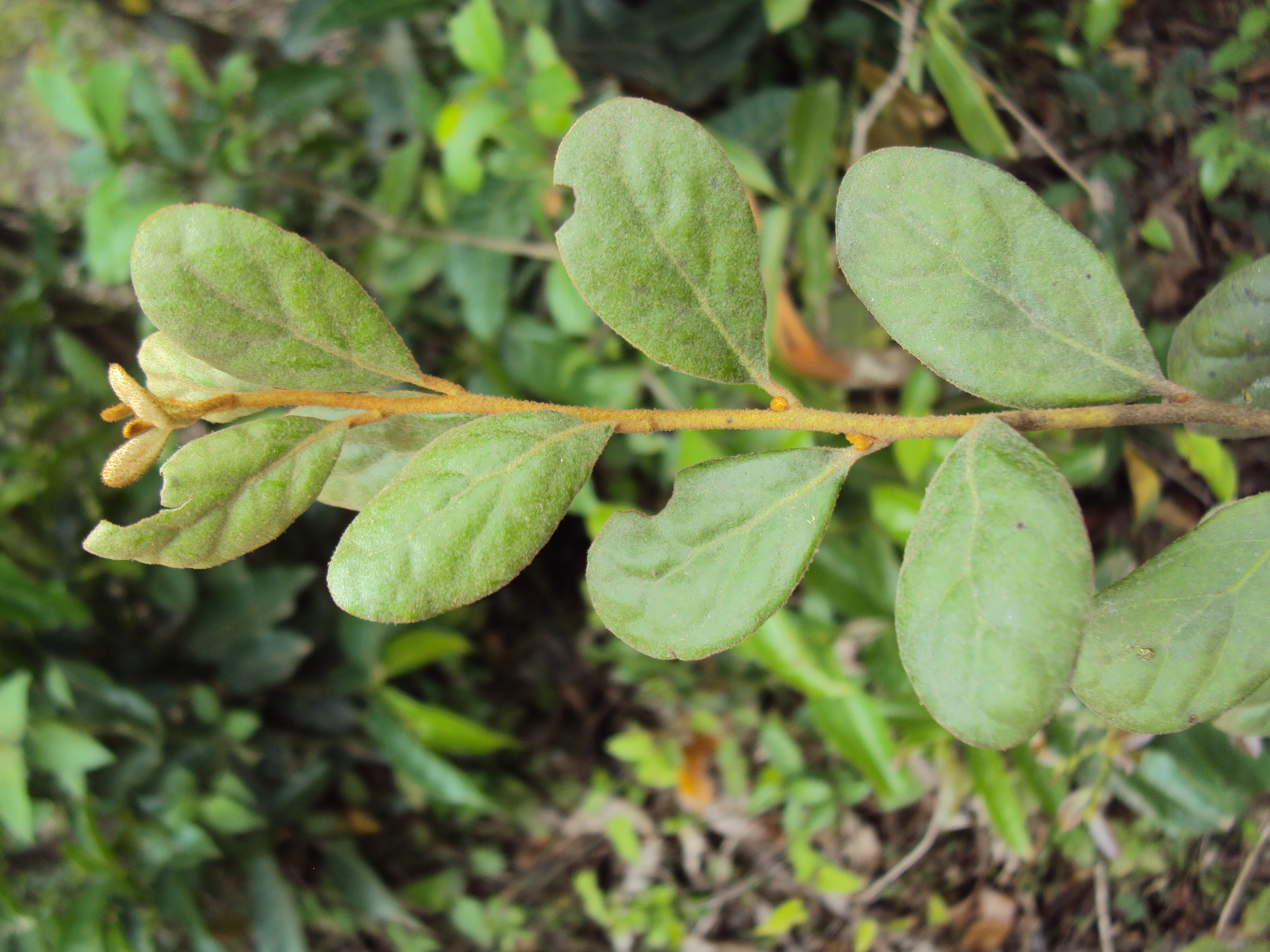
- Scurrula parasitica flower (top) and branch (bottom)

Scientific classification
- Kingdom: Plantae
- Clade: Tracheophytes
- Clade: Angiosperms
- Clade: Eudicots
- Order: Santalales
- Family: Loranthaceae
- Genus: Scurrula; L.

Type species
- Scurrula parasitica L.

Species
- See here

= Scurrula =

Genus of mistletoes

Scurrula is a genus of parasitic shrubs in the family Loranthaceae, native to south-east Asia.

== Description ==
=== Vegetative characteristics ===
Scurrula are parasitic shrubs

=== Generative characteristics ===
The inflorescence is a raceme. The glabrous or pubescent fruits are clavate, pyriform, or turbinate.

== Taxonomy ==
It was described by Carl Linnaeus in 1753 with Scurrula parasitica L. as the type species.

=== Species ===
The Catalogue of Life lists the following species:

- Scurrula aphodastrica
- Scurrula argentea
- Scurrula atropurpurea
- Scurrula buddleioides
- Scurrula chingii
- Scurrula cordifolia
- Scurrula corynitis
- Scurrula didyma
- Scurrula elata
- Scurrula ferruginea
- Scurrula gongshanensis
- Scurrula lepidota
- Scurrula meeboldii
- Scurrula montana
- Scurrula notothixoides
- Scurrula oortiana
- Scurrula parasitica
- Scurrula phoebe-formosanae
- Scurrula pulverulenta
- Scurrula rhopalocarpa
- Scurrula robertsonii
- Scurrula rugulosa
- Scurrula stocksii
- Scurrula tsaii
- Scurrula turbinata

== Parasitism ==
Scurrula has a low host-specificity and can parasitize various plants.

== Distribution ==
The centre of diversity is Java.
