= Barathranthus =

Scientific classification
- Kingdom: Plantae
- Clade: Tracheophytes
- Clade: Angiosperms
- Clade: Eudicots
- Order: Santalales
- Family: Loranthaceae
- Genus: Barathranthus (Korth.) Miq.

Synonyms
- Loranthus [infragen.unranked] Barathranthus Korth.; Cyathiscus Tiegh.

Genus of flowering plants

Barathranthus is a genus of flowering plants belonging to the family Loranthaceae. It includes four species native to Sri Lanka, to Indo-China and Malesia. Species are aerial stem-parasitic shrubs. They are likely related to Loranthus and Helixanthera, and differ in having condensed, capitate inflorescences.

== Species ==
Four species are accepted.

- Baratranthus axanthus (Korth.) Miq.
- Barathranthus mabioides (Trimen) Danser
- Baratranthus nodiflorus (Thwaites) Tiegh.
- Baratranthus productus (King) Tiegh.
