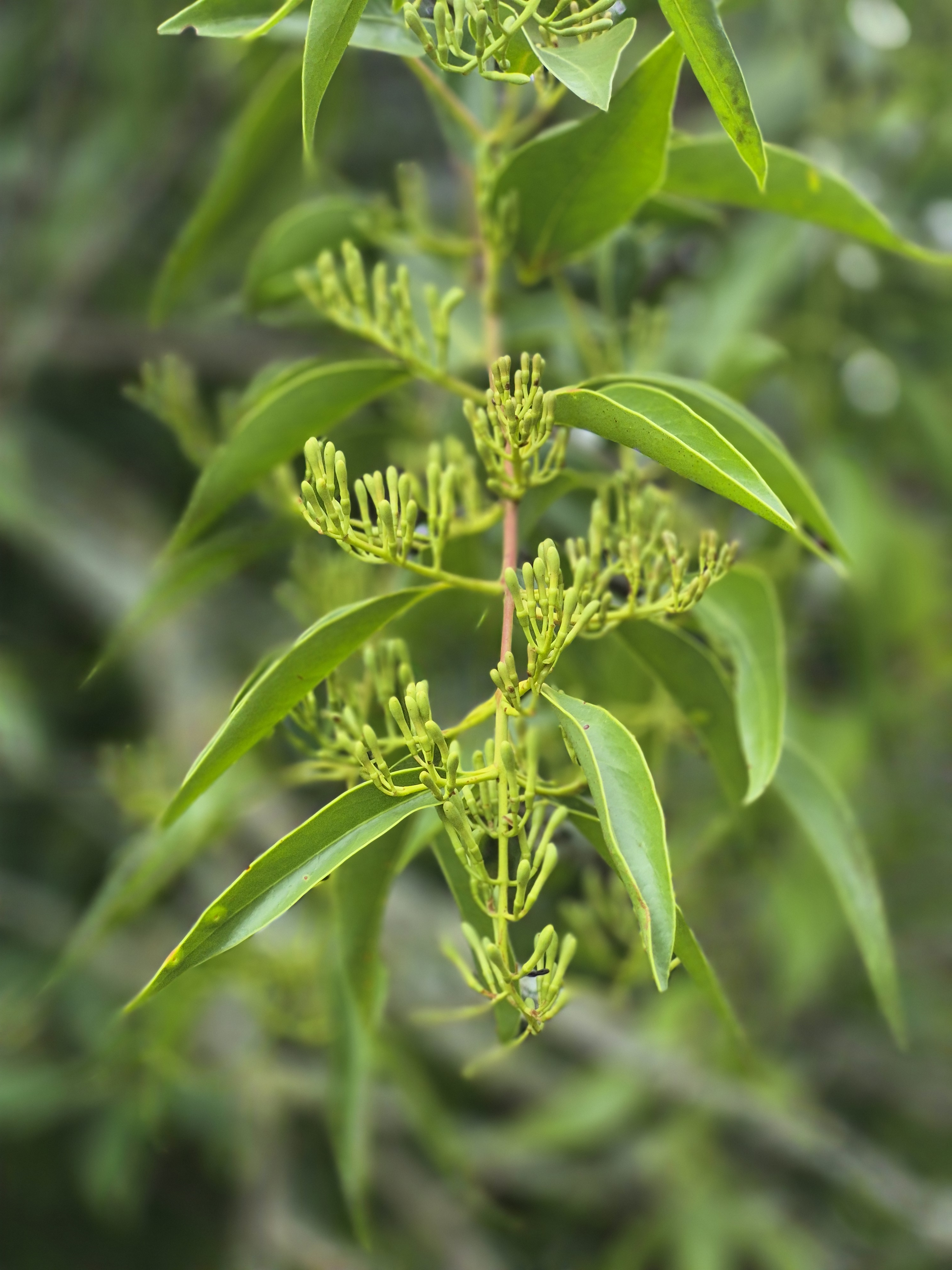
- Tripodanthus acutifolius in southern Brazil

Scientific classification
- Kingdom: Plantae
- Clade: Embryophytes
- Clade: Tracheophytes
- Clade: Spermatophytes
- Clade: Angiosperms
- Clade: Eudicots
- Order: Santalales
- Family: Loranthaceae
- Genus: Tripodanthus; Tiegh.

= Tripodanthus =

Genus of flowering plants

Tripodanthus is a genus of flowering plants belonging to the family Loranthaceae.

Its native range is Southern Tropical America.

Species:

- Tripodanthus acutifolius (Ruiz & Pav.) Tiegh.
- Tripodanthus belmirensis F.J.Roldán & Kuijt
- Tripodanthus flagellaris (Cham. & Schltdl.) Tiegh.
