= Berhautia =

Scientific classification
- Kingdom: Plantae
- Clade: Tracheophytes
- Clade: Angiosperms
- Clade: Eudicots
- Order: Santalales
- Family: Loranthaceae
- Genus: Berhautia; Balle

Genus of flowering plants

Berhautia is a genus of flowering plants belonging to the family Loranthaceae.

Its native range is Western Tropical Africa.

Species:

- Berhautia senegalensis Balle
