= Moquiniella =

Scientific classification
- Kingdom: Plantae
- Clade: Tracheophytes
- Clade: Angiosperms
- Clade: Eudicots
- Order: Santalales
- Family: Loranthaceae
- Genus: Moquiniella; Balle

Synonyms
- Lichtensteinia elegans Tiegh.; Loranthus burchellii (DC.) Eckl. & Zeyh.; Loranthus elegans Cham. & Schltdl.; Loranthus schlechtendalianus Schult. & Schult.f.; Moquinia rubra A.Spreng.

Species of flowering plant

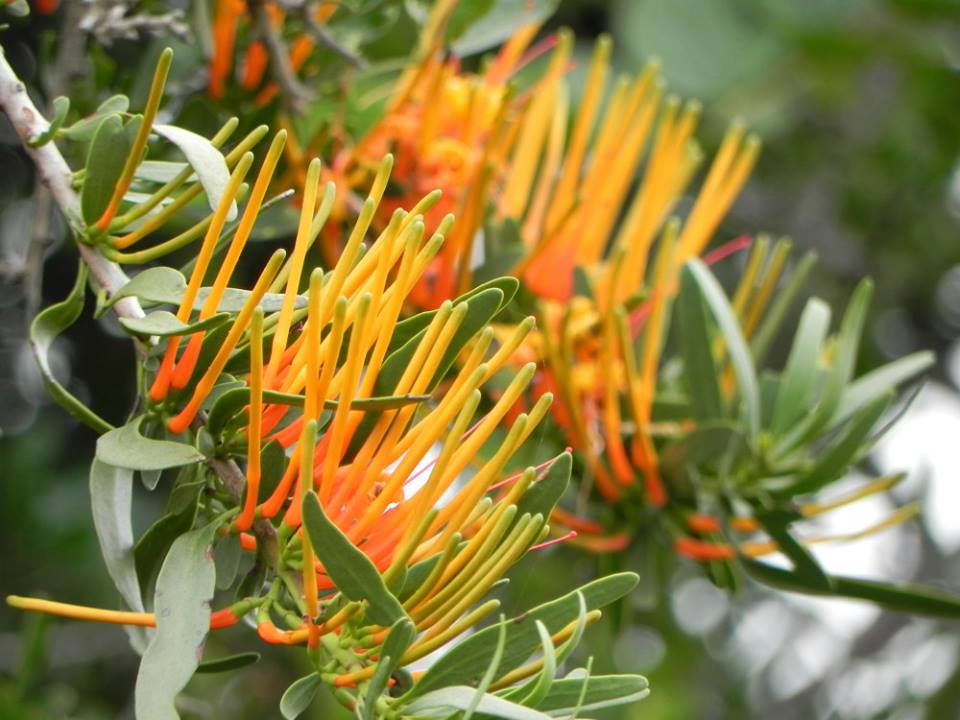
The only type of Moquiniella: Moquiniella Rubra

Moquiniella is a monotypic genus of flowering plants belonging to the family Loranthaceae. It only contains one known species, Moquiniella rubra (A.Spreng.) Balle

It is native to Namibia and the Cape Provinces (region in South Africa).

The genus name of Moquiniella is in honour of Alfred Moquin-Tandon (1804–1863), a French naturalist and doctor. The genus of Moquiniella has 2 known synonyms, Lichtensteinia J.C.Wendl. and Moquinia A.Spreng.. The Latin specific epithet of rubra means red. Both the genus and the species were first described and published in Bull. Séances Inst. Roy. Colon. Belge Vol.25 on pages 1628-1630 in 1954.
