= Peristethium =

Scientific classification
- Kingdom: Plantae
- Clade: Tracheophytes
- Clade: Angiosperms
- Clade: Eudicots
- Order: Santalales
- Family: Loranthaceae
- Genus: Peristethium; Tiegh.

Genus of plants

Peristethium is a genus of flowering plants belonging to the family Loranthaceae.

Its native range is Costa Rica to Southern Tropical America.

== Species ==
Species:

- Peristethium aequatoris (Kuijt) Kuijt
- Peristethium archeri (A.C.Sm.) Kuijt
- Peristethium attenuatum Kuijt
- Peristethium colombianum Kuijt
- Peristethium confertiflorum Kuijt
- Peristethium grahamii Kuijt
- Peristethium lamprophyllum Kuijt
- Peristethium leptostachyum (Kunth) Tiegh.
- Peristethium lojae (Kuijt) Kuijt
- Peristethium nitidum (Kuijt) Kuijt
- Peristethium palandense Kuijt
- Peristethium peruviense (Kuijt) Kuijt
- Peristethium phaneroneurum (Standl.) Caires
- Peristethium polystachyum (Ruiz & Pav.) Kuijt
- Peristethium primarium (Kuijt) Kuijt
- Peristethium reticulatum (Rizzini) Caires
- Peristethium roraimense (Steyerm.) Kuijt
- Peristethium tortistylum (Kuijt) Kuijt
