= Socratina =

Scientific classification
- Kingdom: Plantae
- Clade: Tracheophytes
- Clade: Angiosperms
- Clade: Eudicots
- Order: Santalales
- Family: Loranthaceae
- Genus: Socratina; Balle

Genus of mistletoes

Socratina is genus of three showy mistletoe species in Madagascar. The genus was described by the Belgian botanist Simone Balle in Flora de Madagascar, 1964, and was revised by Martin Callmander and co-workers in 2014. It contains three species.

- Socratina bemarivensis (Lecomte) S.Balle
- Socratina kerauderiana S.Balle
- Socratina phillipsoniana Callm. & Luino
