= Septulina =

Scientific classification
- Kingdom: Plantae
- Clade: Tracheophytes
- Clade: Angiosperms
- Clade: Eudicots
- Order: Santalales
- Family: Loranthaceae
- Genus: Septulina; Tiegh.

Genus of plants

Septulina is a genus of flowering plants belonging to the family Loranthaceae.

Its native range is Southern Namibia to South African Republic.

== Species ==
Species:

- Septulina glauca (Thunb.) Tiegh.
- Septulina ovalis (E.Mey. ex Harv.) Tiegh.
