= Oliverella =

Scientific classification
- Kingdom: Plantae
- Clade: Tracheophytes
- Clade: Angiosperms
- Clade: Eudicots
- Order: Santalales
- Family: Loranthaceae
- Genus: Oliverella; Tiegh

Genus of flowering plants

Oliverella is a genus of flowering plants belonging to the family Loranthaceae.

It is native to Botswana, Ethiopia, Kenya, Mozambique, Sudan, Tanzania, Uganda, Zambia and Zimbabwe.

The genus name of Oliverella is in honour of Daniel Oliver (1830–1916), an English botanist. He was also Librarian of the Herbarium, Royal Botanic Gardens, Kew from 1860–1890 and Keeper there from 1864–1890, and Professor of Botany at University College, London from 1861–1888. It was first described and published in Bull. Soc. Bot. France Vol.42 on page 259 in 1895.

== Known species ==
According to Kew:

- Oliverella bussei (Sprague) Polhill & Wiens
- Oliverella hildebrandtii (Engl.) Tiegh.
- Oliverella rubroviridis Tiegh.
