= Spragueanella =

Scientific classification
- Kingdom: Plantae
- Clade: Embryophytes
- Clade: Tracheophytes
- Clade: Spermatophytes
- Clade: Angiosperms
- Clade: Eudicots
- Order: Santalales
- Family: Loranthaceae
- Genus: Spragueanella; Balle

Genus of flowering plants

Spragueanella is a genus of flowering plants belonging to the family Loranthaceae.

Its native range is eastern and southern parts of Tropical Africa, within the countries of Kenya, Malawi, Mozambique, Tanzania, Zambia and Zimbabwe.

The genus name of Spragueanella is in honour of Thomas Archibald Sprague (1877–1958), a Scottish botanist. It was first described and published in Bull. Séances Inst. Roy. Colon. Belge Vol.25 on page 1632 in 1954.

== Known species ==
According to Kew:

- Spragueanella curta Wiens & Polhill
- Spragueanella rhamnifolia (Engl.) Balle
