= Englerina =

Scientific classification
- Kingdom: Plantae
- Clade: Tracheophytes
- Clade: Angiosperms
- Clade: Eudicots
- Order: Santalales
- Family: Loranthaceae
- Genus: Englerina; Tiegh.

Synonyms
- Ischnanthus Tiegh. Stephaniscus Tiegh.

Genus of plants

Englerina is a genus of flowering plants belonging to the family Loranthaceae.

Its native range is Tropical Africa.

The genus name of Englerina is in honour of Adolf Engler (1844–1930), a German botanist, it was first published and described in Bull. Soc. Bot. France Vol.42 on page 257 in 1895.

== Species ==
Known species:

- Englerina collinsii Polhill & Q.Luke
- Englerina concinna Polhill & Wiens
- Englerina cordata Polhill & Wiens
- Englerina drummondii Balle ex Polhill & Wiens
- Englerina gabonensis (Engl.) Balle
- Englerina heckmanniana (Engl.) Polhill & Wiens
- Englerina holstii (Engl.) Tiegh.
- Englerina inaequilatera (Engl.) Gilli
- Englerina kagehensis (Engl.) Polhill & Wiens
- Englerina kapiriensis (Balle) Polhill & Wiens
- Englerina kwaiensis (Engl.) Polhill & Wiens
- Englerina lecardii (Engl.) Balle
- Englerina longiflora Polhill & Wiens
- Englerina luluensis (Engl.) Polhill & Wiens
- Englerina macilenta Polhill & Wiens
- Englerina muerensis (Engl.) Polhill & Wiens
- Englerina ochroleuca (Engl. & K.Krause) Balle
- Englerina oedostemon (Danser) Polhill & Wiens
- Englerina parviflora (Tiegh.) Balle
- Englerina ramulosa (Sprague) Polhill & Wiens
- Englerina schlechteri (Engl.) Polhill & Wiens
- Englerina schubotziana (Engl. & K.Krause) Polhill & Wiens
- Englerina subquadrangularis (De Wild.) Polhill & Wiens
- Englerina swynnertonii (Sprague) Polhill & Wiens
- Englerina triplinervia (Baker & Sprague) Polhill & Wiens
- Englerina woodfordioides (Schweinf.) Balle
