= Globimetula =

Scientific classification
- Kingdom: Plantae
- Clade: Tracheophytes
- Clade: Angiosperms
- Clade: Eudicots
- Order: Santalales
- Family: Loranthaceae
- Genus: Globimetula; Tiegh.

Genus of plants

Globimetula is a genus of flowering plants belonging to the family Loranthaceae.

Its native range is Tropical Africa.

Species:

- Globimetula anguliflora (Engl.) Danser
- Globimetula assiana (Balle) Wiens & Polhill
- Globimetula braunii (Engl.) Danser
- Globimetula cornutibracteata Balle ex Wiens & Polhill
- Globimetula cupulata (DC.) Danser
- Globimetula dinklagei (Engl.) Danser
- Globimetula elegantiflora (Balle) Balle
- Globimetula kivuensis (Balle) Wiens & Polhill
- Globimetula mayombensis (De Wild.) Danser
- Globimetula mweroensis (Baker) Danser
- Globimetula oreophila (Oliv. ex Hook.f.) Danser
- Globimetula pachyclada (Sprague) Danser
- Globimetula rubripes (Engl.) Danser
