= Lepidaria =

Scientific classification
- Kingdom: Plantae
- Clade: Tracheophytes
- Clade: Angiosperms
- Clade: Eudicots
- Order: Santalales
- Family: Loranthaceae
- Genus: Lepidaria; Tiegh.

Genus of plants

Lepidaria is a genus of flowering plants belonging to the family Loranthaceae.

Its native range is Thailand to Western and Central Malesia.

Species:

- Lepidaria bicarinata Tiegh.
- Lepidaria biflora Tiegh.
- Lepidaria kingii (Scort. ex King) Danser
- Lepidaria oviceps Danser
- Lepidaria pulchella Danser
- Lepidaria quadriflora Tiegh.
- Lepidaria sabaensis (Stapf) Danser
- Lepidaria tetrantha (Merr.) Danser
- Lepidaria vaginata Tiegh.
