= Sogerianthe =

Scientific classification
- Kingdom: Plantae
- Clade: Tracheophytes
- Clade: Angiosperms
- Clade: Eudicots
- Order: Santalales
- Family: Loranthaceae
- Genus: Sogerianthe; Danser

Genus of plants

Sogerianthe is a genus of flowering plants belonging to the family Loranthaceae.

Its native range is Papuasia.

Species:

- Sogerianthe cupuliformis Barlow
- Sogerianthe ferruginea Danser
- Sogerianthe sessiliflora (Danser) Danser
- Sogerianthe sogerensis (S.Moore) Danser
- Sogerianthe trilobobractea Danser
- Sogerianthe versicolor Danser
