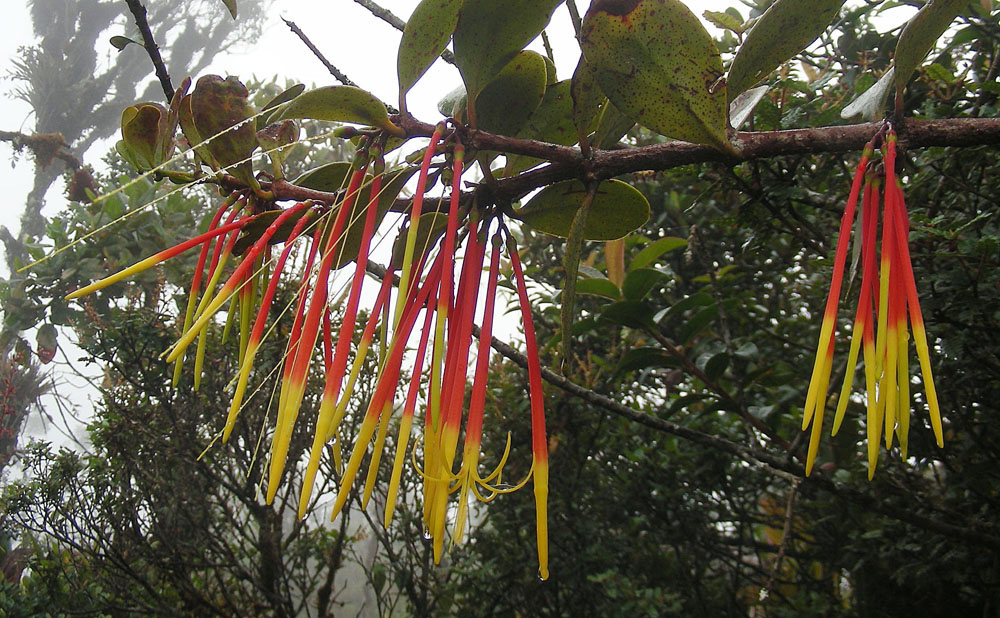
- Aetanthus nodosus

Scientific classification
- Kingdom: Plantae
- Clade: Tracheophytes
- Clade: Angiosperms
- Clade: Eudicots
- Order: Santalales
- Family: Loranthaceae
- Genus: Aetanthus (Eichler) Engl.

= Aetanthus =

Genus of flowering plants

Aetanthus is a genus of flowering plants belonging to the family Loranthaceae.

Its native range is Venezuela to Peru.

Species:

- Aetanthus andreanus (Tiegh.) Engl.
- Aetanthus colombianus A.C.Sm.
- Aetanthus coriaceus Pacz.
- Aetanthus engelsii (Tiegh.) Engl.
- Aetanthus macranthus (Hook.) Kuijt
- Aetanthus megaphyllus Kuijt
- Aetanthus mutisii (Kunth) Engl.
- Aetanthus nodosus (Desr.) Engl.
- Aetanthus ornatus K.Krause
- Aetanthus ovalis Rusby
- Aetanthus pascoensis Kuijt
- Aetanthus prolongatus Kuijt
- Aetanthus sessilifolius Kuijt
- Aetanthus tachirensis Kuijt
- Aetanthus trifolius Kuijt
- Aetanthus validus Kuijt
