= Panamanthus =

Scientific classification
- Kingdom: Plantae
- Clade: Tracheophytes
- Clade: Angiosperms
- Clade: Eudicots
- Order: Santalales
- Family: Loranthaceae
- Genus: Panamanthus; Kuijt
- Species: P. panamensis

Binomial name
- Panamanthus panamensis (Rizzini) Kuijt

Genus of plants

Panamanthus is a monotypic genus of flowering plants belonging to the family Loranthaceae. The only species is Panamanthus panamensis.

Its native range is Costa Rica to Panama.
