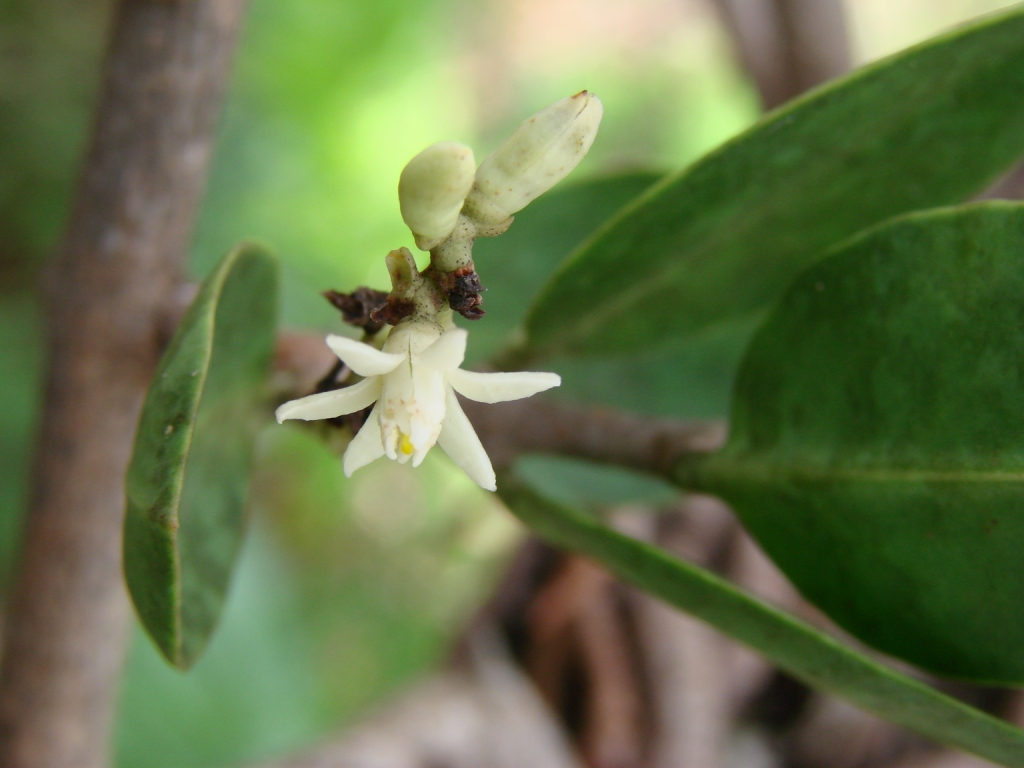

Scientific classification
- Kingdom: Plantae
- Clade: Tracheophytes
- Clade: Angiosperms
- Clade: Eudicots
- Order: Santalales
- Family: Loranthaceae
- Genus: Passovia; H.Karst.

Synonyms
- Allohemia Raf.

= Passovia =

Genus of flowering plant

Passovia is a genus of flowering plants belonging to the family Loranthaceae.

Its native range is south-eastern Mexico to Tropical America. It is found in Belize, Bolivia, Brazil, Colombia, Costa Rica, Ecuador, El Salvador, French Guiana, Guatemala, Guyana, Honduras, Jamaica, Mexico, Nicaragua, Panamá, Peru, Suriname, Trinidad-Tobago, Venezuela, Venezuelan Antilles and the Windward Islands.

The genus name of Passovia is in honour of Friedrich Passow (19th century), the German consul in Puerto Cabello in Venezuela. He was also a member of Rostock's naturalist society. It was first described and published in Bot. Zeitung (Berlin) Vol.4 on page 107 in 1846.

== Known species ==
According to Kew:

- Passovia beckii Kuijt
- Passovia biloba Kuijt
- Passovia bisexualis (Rizzini) Kuijt
- Passovia brasiliana Kuijt
- Passovia coarctata (A.C.Sm.) Kuijt
- Passovia cordata Kuijt
- Passovia diffusa Kuijt
- Passovia disjectifolia (Rizzini) Kuijt
- Passovia ensifera Kuijt
- Passovia myrsinites (Eichler) Tiegh.
- Passovia ovata (Pohl ex DC.) Tiegh.
- Passovia pedunculata (Jacq.) Kuijt
- Passovia podoptera (Cham. & Schltdl.) Kuijt
- Passovia pycnostachya (Eichler) Tiegh.
- Passovia pyrifolia (Kunth) Tiegh.
- Passovia robusta (Rusby) Kuijt
- Passovia rufa (Mart. ex Schult. & Schult.f.) Tiegh.
- Passovia santaremensis (Eichler) Tiegh.
- Passovia subtilis Kuijt
- Passovia theloneura (Eichler) Tiegh.
