= Thaumasianthes =

Scientific classification
- Kingdom: Plantae
- Clade: Tracheophytes
- Clade: Angiosperms
- Clade: Eudicots
- Order: Santalales
- Family: Loranthaceae
- Genus: Thaumasianthes; Danser

Genus of flowering plants

Thaumasianthes is a genus of flowering plants belonging to the family Loranthaceae.

Its native range is Philippines.

Species:

- Thaumasianthes amplifolia (Merr.) Danser
