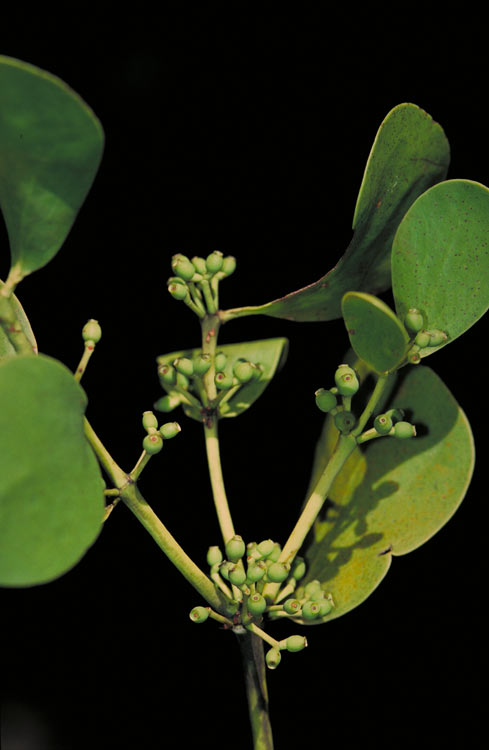
- Close-up of foliage

Scientific classification
- Kingdom: Plantae
- Clade: Tracheophytes
- Clade: Angiosperms
- Clade: Eudicots
- Order: Santalales
- Family: Loranthaceae
- Genus: Cecarria; Barlow
- Species: C. obtusifolia

Binomial name
- Cecarria obtusifolia (Merr.) Barlow
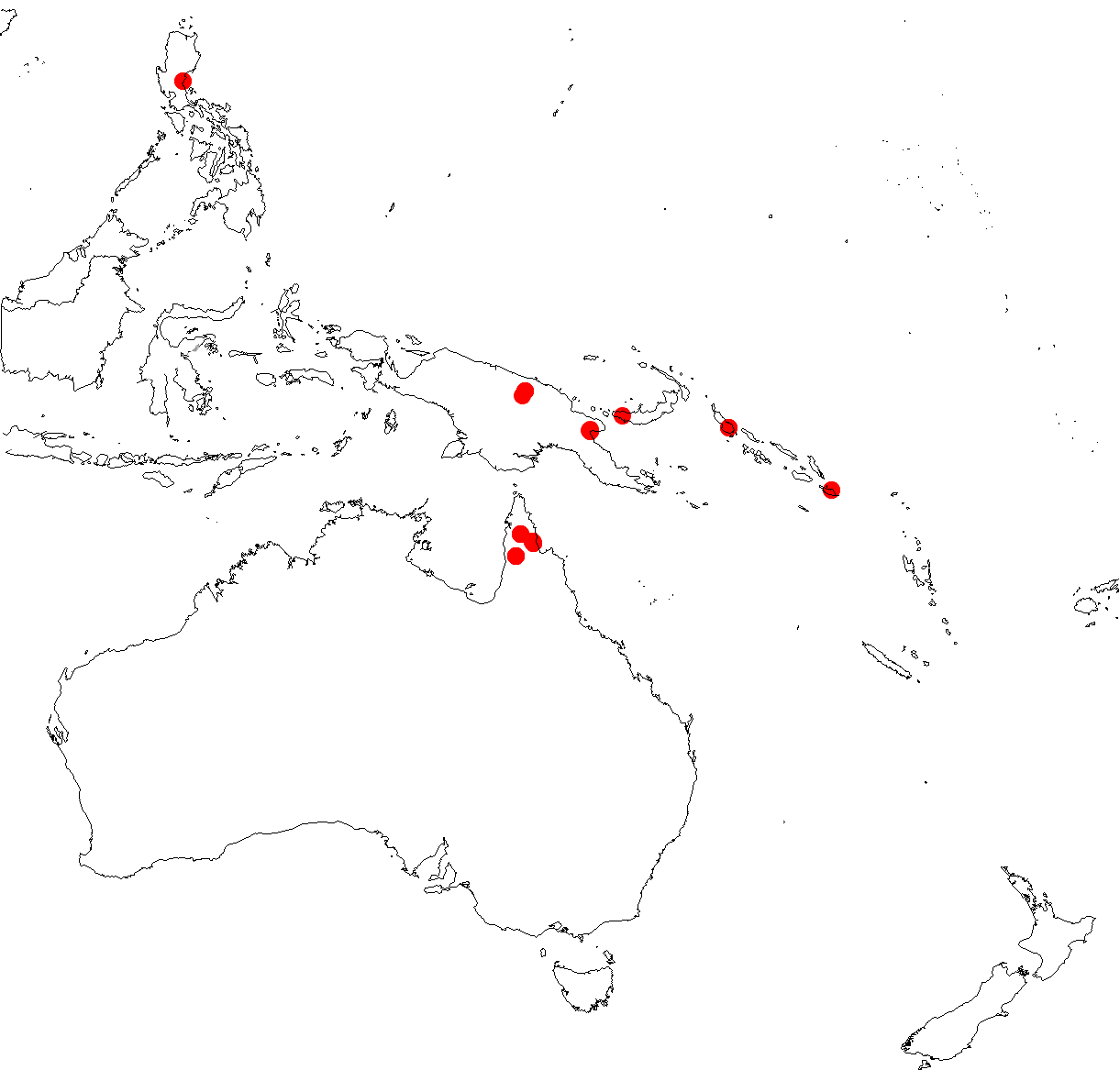
- Occurrence data from GBIF

Synonyms
- Phrygilanthus obtusifolius Merr. (nom. illeg.); Muellerina obtusifolia (Merr.) Barlow

= Cecarria =

Genus of mistletoes

Cecarria is a monotypic genus in the family Loranthaceae. The sole species is Cecarria obtusifolia, a hemiparasitic aerial shrub.

== Description ==
Cecarria obtusifolia is an aerial, stem-parasitic shrub, and like species in the genus Muellerina, it has epicortical runners. It is glabrous throughout. The obovate or broadly obovate leaves are opposite, curvinerved, and rounded at the apex. The leaf blades are 30–55 mm long and 20–45 mm wide, and attenuate into an obscure petiole 2–6 mm long. The inflorescence is axillary, with and a two-flowered umbel or a four-flowered raceme or spike; there are nearly orbicular bracts beneath each flower. The flower has six free petals. The stamens are nearly equal, and the anthers are dorsifixed and versatile, having a short sterile tip with the free part of the filament about 2 mm long.

The peduncle is 6–9 mm long and up to 20 mm when the inflorescence is a raceme. The flowers are sessile or on pedicels up to 3 mm long. The calyx is entire and 0.5–1 mm long. The ivory-white corolla in mature bud is 10–14 mm long and slightly club-shaped. The fruit is almost spherical and about 8 mm long.

== Distribution and habitat ==
Cecarria obtusifolia occurs in the Philippines, New Guinea, the Solomon Islands, and in Cape York Peninsula, Queensland, Australia, and also in the Lesser Sunda Islands and Bougainville (New Guinea). The genus is thought to be a relictual Gondwanan entity.

In Australia it occurs in the McIlwraith Range area in Queensland, growing in rainforest. Recorded hosts include plants in the genera: Calophyllum, Casuarina, and Syzygium, and Xanthostemon.

== Taxonomy ==
The species was first described by Elmer Drew Merrill as Phrygilanthus obtusifolius in 1906. In 1973, Bryan Barlow redescribed it, assigning it to the new genus, Cecarria, and the name thus became C. obtusifolia. The current accepted description is that of Barlow in 1984.

The genus Cecarria is named for Cedric Errol Carr (1892–1936). The leaves, which are blunt and rounded at the apex (tip), gave rise to the latin-derived name, obtusifolia, meaning "obtuse-leaved".

== Conservation ==
It is considered to be "Not Threatened" (NT) in Queensland under the Nature Conservation Act 1992 of Queensland.
