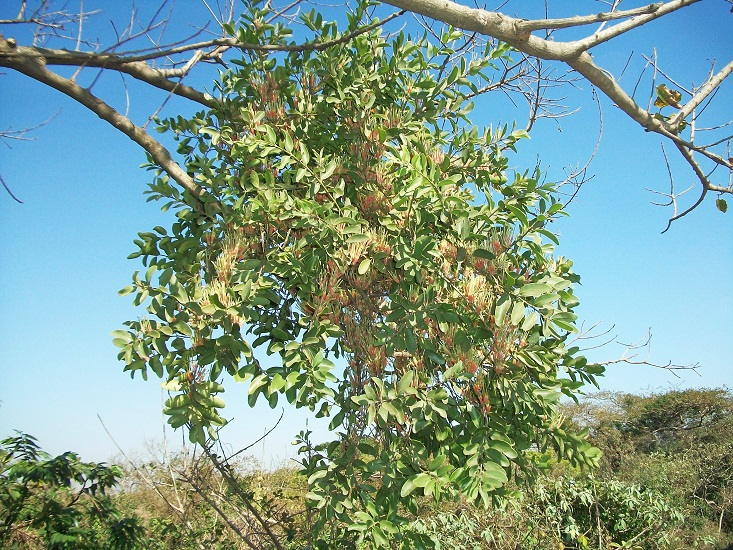

Scientific classification
- Kingdom: Plantae
- Clade: Tracheophytes
- Clade: Angiosperms
- Clade: Eudicots
- Order: Santalales
- Family: Loranthaceae
- Genus: Erianthemum; Tiegh.

= Erianthemum =

Genus of plants

Erianthemum is a genus of flowering plants belonging to the family Loranthaceae.

Its native range is Tropical and Southern Africa.

Species:

- Erianthemum aethiopicum Balle ex Wiens & Polhill
- Erianthemum alveatum (Sprague) Danser
- Erianthemum commiphorae (Engl.) Danser
- Erianthemum dregei (Eckl. & Zeyh.) Tiegh.
- Erianthemum lanatum Wiens & Polhill
- Erianthemum lindense (Sprague) Danser
- Erianthemum melanocarpum (Balle) Wiens & Polhill
- Erianthemum ngamicum (Sprague) Danser
- Erianthemum nyikense (Sprague) Danser
- Erianthemum occultum (Sprague) Danser
- Erianthemum rotundifolium Wiens & Polhill
- Erianthemum schelei (Engl.) Tiegh.
- Erianthemum schmitzii Balle ex Wiens & Polhill
- Erianthemum taborensis (Engl.) Tiegh.
- Erianthemum virescens (N.E.Br.) Wiens & Polhill
- Erianthemum viticola Balle ex Wiens & Polhill
