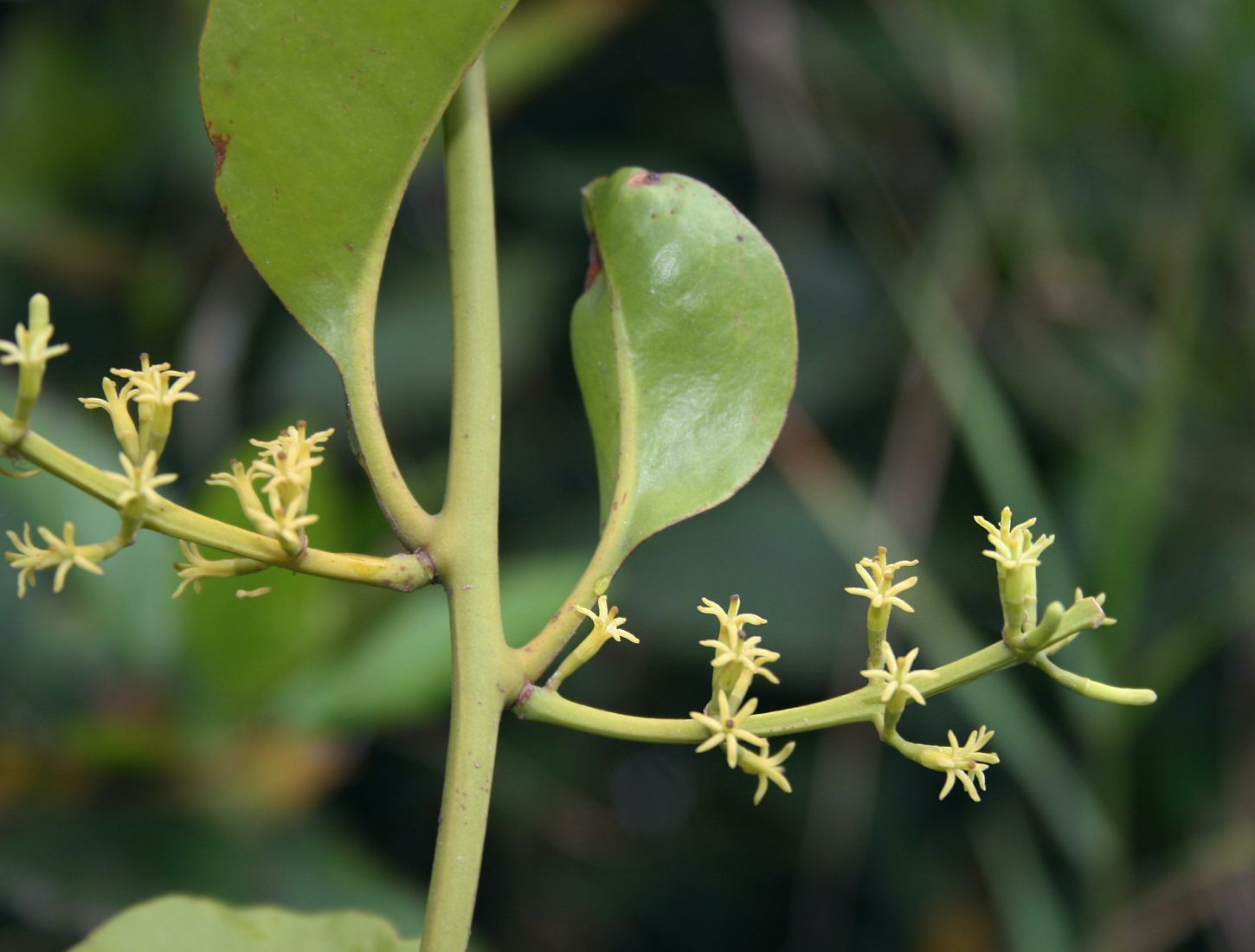
- Struthanthus orbicularis

Scientific classification
- Kingdom: Plantae
- Clade: Tracheophytes
- Clade: Angiosperms
- Clade: Eudicots
- Order: Santalales
- Family: Loranthaceae
- Genus: Struthanthus; Mart.

= Struthanthus =

Genus of mistletoes

Struthanthus is a genus of flowering plants in the family Loranthaceae.

Species include:

- Struthanthus acostensis L.A.González & J.F.Morales
- Struthanthus acuminatus (Ruiz & Pav.) Blume ex J.F.Macbr.
- Struthanthus alni Bartlett
- Struthanthus andrastylus Eichler
- Struthanthus angustifolius (Griseb.) Hauman
- Struthanthus apiculatus Kuijt
- Struthanthus armandianus Rizzini
- Struthanthus attenuatus (Pohl) Eichler
- Struthanthus brachybotrys Standl. & Steyerm.
- Struthanthus burgeri Kuijt
- Struthanthus cajamarcanus Kuijt
- Struthanthus calobotrys Eichler
- Struthanthus calophyllus A.C.Sm.
- Struthanthus cansjerifolius (Oliv.) Eichler
- Struthanthus capitatus Lundell
- Struthanthus cassythoides Millsp. ex Standl.
- Struthanthus citricola (Mart. ex Schult. & Schult.f.) Mart.
- Struthanthus concinnus Mart.
- Struthanthus condensatus Kuijt
- Struthanthus confertus Mart.
- Struthanthus corymbifer Rizzini
- Struthanthus costaricensis Standl.
- Struthanthus crassipes (Oliv.) Eichler
- Struthanthus cupulatus (Kuijt) Galv.-González
- Struthanthus cuspidatus Mart.
- Struthanthus dentatus Kuijt
- Struthanthus deppeanus (Schltdl. & Cham.) G.Don
- Struthanthus dorothyae Rizzini
- Struthanthus elegans Mart.
- Struthanthus filipes Kuijt
- Struthanthus flexicaulis Mart.
- Struthanthus flexilis (Rusby) Kuijt
- Struthanthus glomeriflorus Eichler
- Struthanthus gracilis (Gleason) Steyerm. & Maguire
- Struthanthus hamatilis Rizzini
- Struthanthus harlingianus Rizzini
- Struthanthus hartwegii (Benth.) Standl.
- Struthanthus hoehnei K.Krause
- Struthanthus ibe-dzi Mald.-Borja & Cerros
- Struthanthus ibegei Rizzini
- Struthanthus interruptus (Kunth) G.Don
- Struthanthus involucratus Rizzini
- Struthanthus johnstonii Standl. & Steyerm.
- Struthanthus lehmannii Engl.
- Struthanthus lewisii Kuijt
- Struthanthus longibracteatus Kuijt
- Struthanthus longiflorus Rizzini
- Struthanthus macrostachyus Lundell
- Struthanthus marginatus (Desr.) G.Don
- Struthanthus martianus Dettke & Waechter
- Struthanthus matudae Lundell
- Struthanthus megalopodus Rizzini
- Struthanthus melanopotamicus Rizzini
- Struthanthus meridionalis Kuijt
- Struthanthus mexicanus Calderón
- Struthanthus microstylus Rizzini
- Struthanthus nigricans Eichler
- Struthanthus nudipes Rusby
- Struthanthus oerstedii (Oliv.) Standl.
- Struthanthus ophiostylus Kuijt
- Struthanthus orbicularis (Kunth) Eichler
- Struthanthus palmeri Kuijt
- Struthanthus papillosus Standl. & Steyerm.
- Struthanthus pentamerus Rizzini
- Struthanthus phillyreoides (Kunth) G.Don
- Struthanthus planaltinae Rizzini
- Struthanthus polyanthus Mart.
- Struthanthus porrectus Rizzini
- Struthanthus prancei Kuijt
- Struthanthus pusillifolius Rizzini
- Struthanthus quadrangularis Kuijt
- Struthanthus quercicola (Schltdl. & Cham.) D.Don
- Struthanthus racemosus (Kuijt) Galv.-González
- Struthanthus radicans (Cham. & Schltdl.) Eichler
- Struthanthus ramiro-cruzii Martínez-Ambr. & Sor.-Benítez
- Struthanthus retusus Blume
- Struthanthus rhynchophyllus Eichler
- Struthanthus rubens (Mart.) Mart.
- Struthanthus rufofurfuraceus Rizzini
- Struthanthus salicifolius Mart.
- Struthanthus salzmannii Eichler
- Struthanthus sarmentosus (Ruiz & Pav.) Blume ex J.F.Macbr.
- Struthanthus savannae Rizzini
- Struthanthus schultesii Kuijt
- Struthanthus spathulatus Rizzini
- Struthanthus staphylinus Mart.
- Struthanthus subtilis Kuijt
- Struthanthus syringifolius (Mart.) Mart.
- Struthanthus tacanensis Lundell
- Struthanthus taubatensis Eichler
- Struthanthus tenuifolius Standl. & Steyerm.
- Struthanthus tenuis Pacz.
- Struthanthus terniflorus (Willd.) Klotzsch
- Struthanthus tetraqueter (Mart.) Mart.
- Struthanthus truncatus Kuijt
- Struthanthus uraguensis (Hook. & Arn.) G.Don
- Struthanthus volubilis Rizzini
- Struthanthus woodsonii Cufod.
