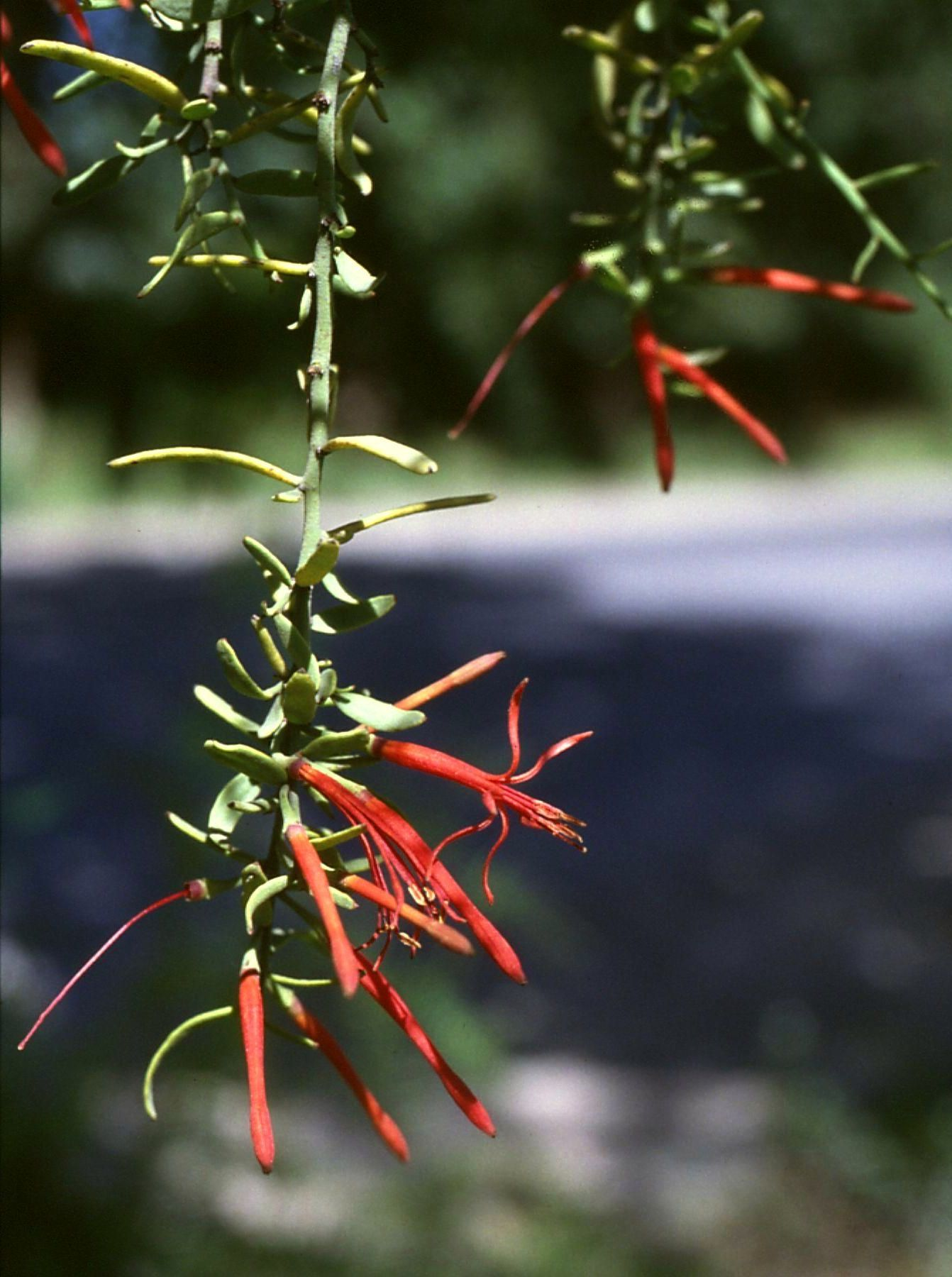
- Ligaria cuneifolia

Scientific classification
- Kingdom: Plantae
- Clade: Tracheophytes
- Clade: Angiosperms
- Clade: Eudicots
- Order: Santalales
- Family: Loranthaceae
- Genus: Ligaria; Tiegh.

= Ligaria (plant) =

Genus of plants

Ligaria is a genus of flowering plants belonging to the family Loranthaceae.

Its native range is Peru to Brazil and Southern South America.

Species:

- Ligaria cuneifolia (Ruiz & Pav.) Tiegh.
- Ligaria teretiflora (Rizzini) Kuijt
