= Elytranthe =

Scientific classification
- Kingdom: Plantae
- Clade: Tracheophytes
- Clade: Angiosperms
- Clade: Eudicots
- Order: Santalales
- Family: Loranthaceae
- Genus: Elytranthe (Blume) Blume

Genus of plants

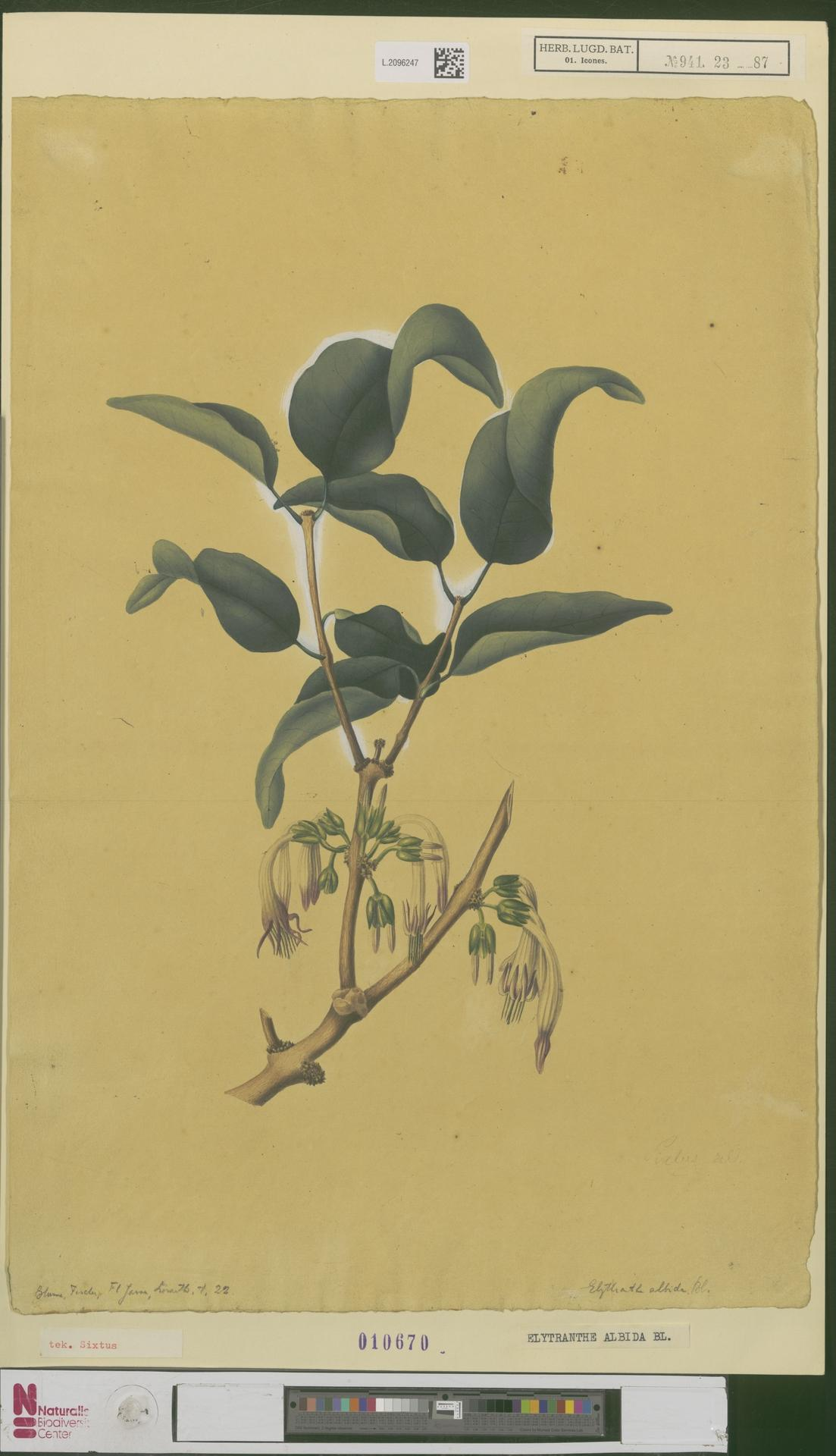
Elytranthe albida

Elytranthe is a genus of flowering plants belonging to the family Loranthaceae.

Its native range is Assam to Southern Central China and Western Malesia.

Species:

- Elytranthe albida (Blume) Blume
- Elytranthe arnottiana (Korth.) Miq.
- Elytranthe colletii (King ex Collett & Hemsl.) Danser
- Elytranthe dranensis (S.Moore) Danser
- Elytranthe petelotii Merr.
- Elytranthe pseudopsilantha Rajasek.
