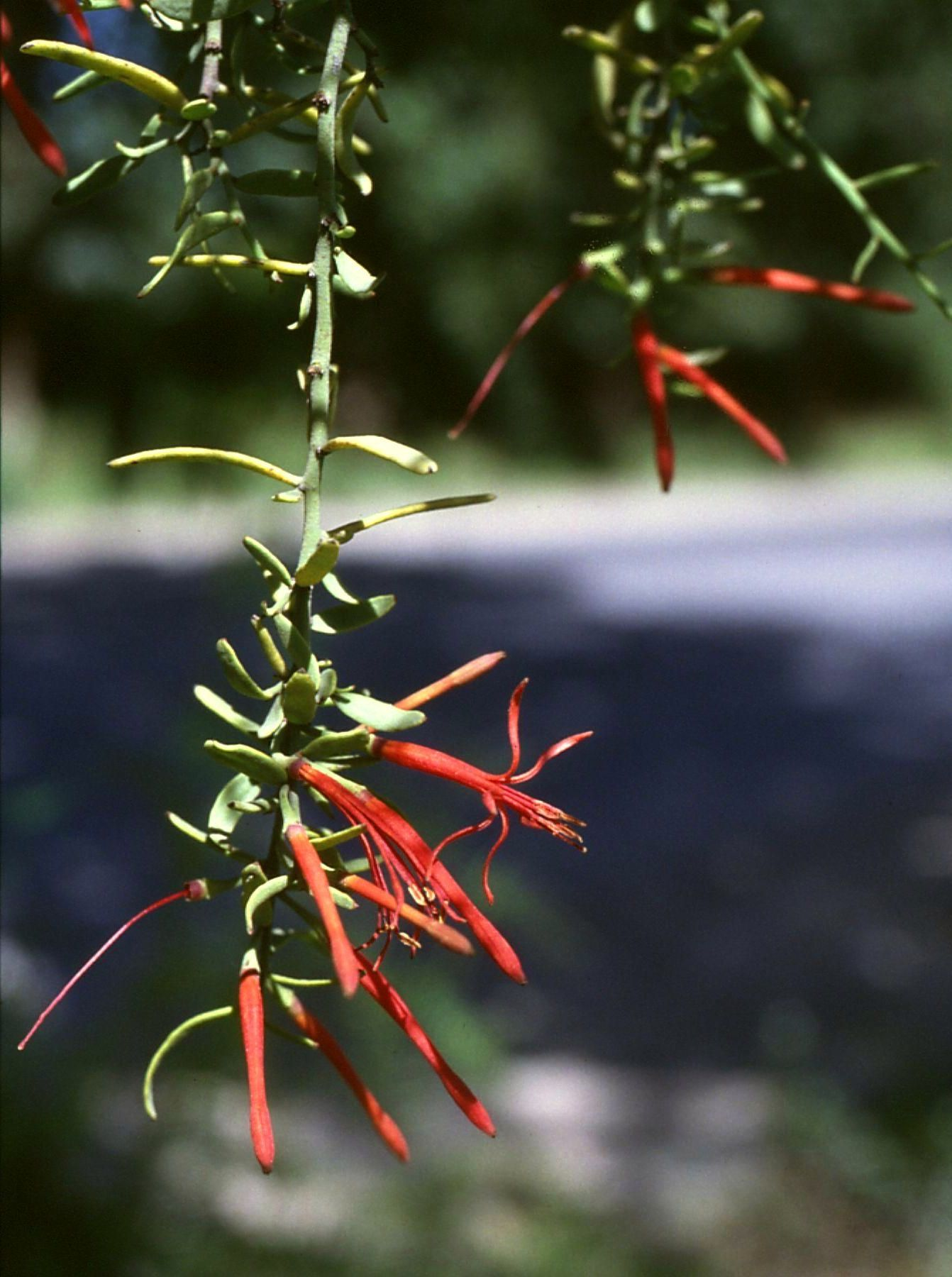
- Ligaria cuneifolia

Scientific classification
- Kingdom: Plantae
- Clade: Embryophytes
- Clade: Tracheophytes
- Clade: Spermatophytes
- Clade: Angiosperms
- Clade: Eudicots
- Order: Santalales
- Family: Loranthaceae; Juss.

Genera
- See text
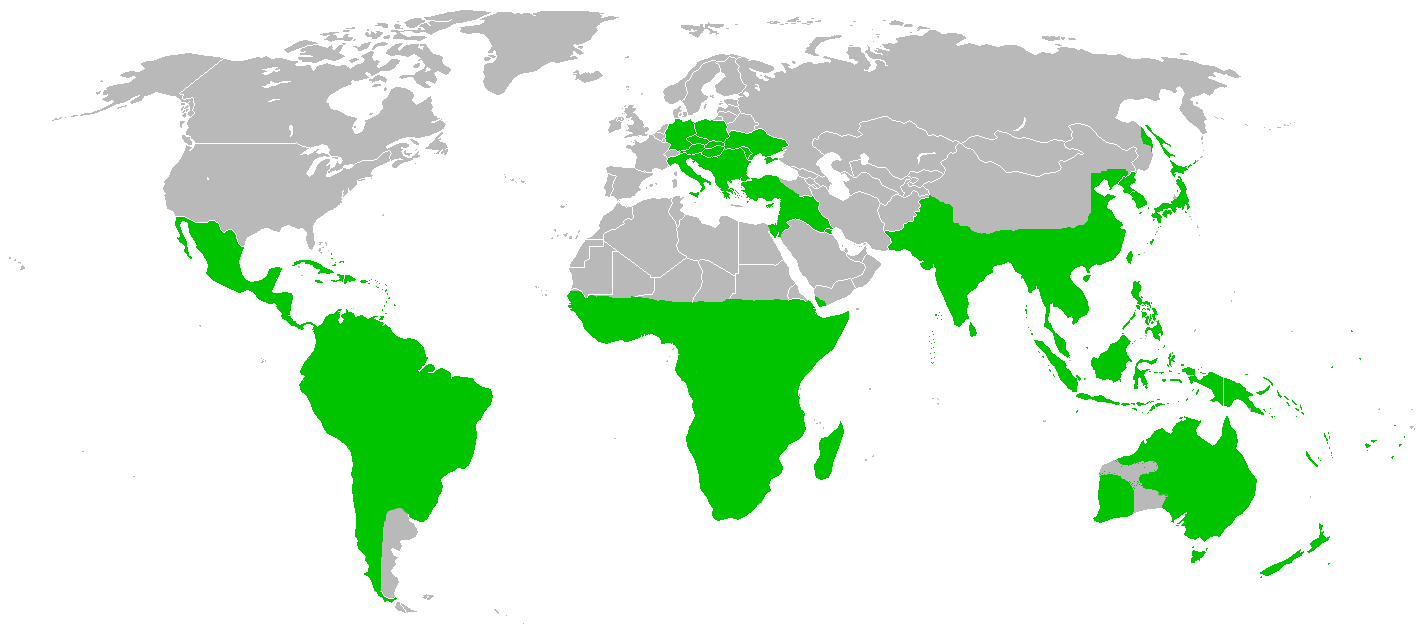
- Distribution of the Loranthaceae.

= Loranthaceae =

Family of mistletoes

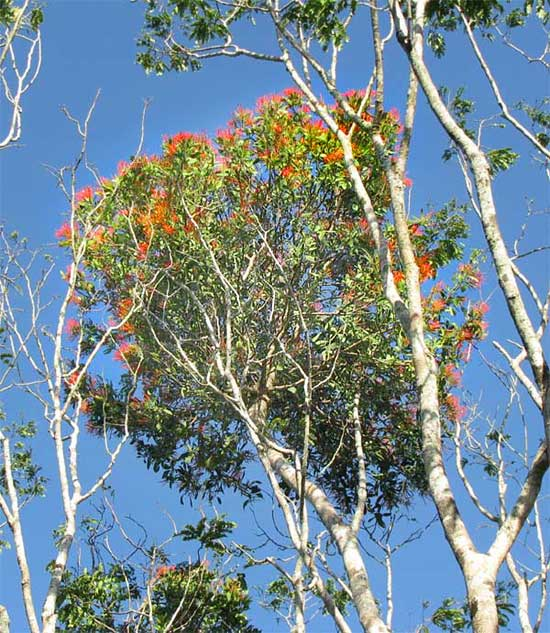
Psittacanthus flowering atop a tree

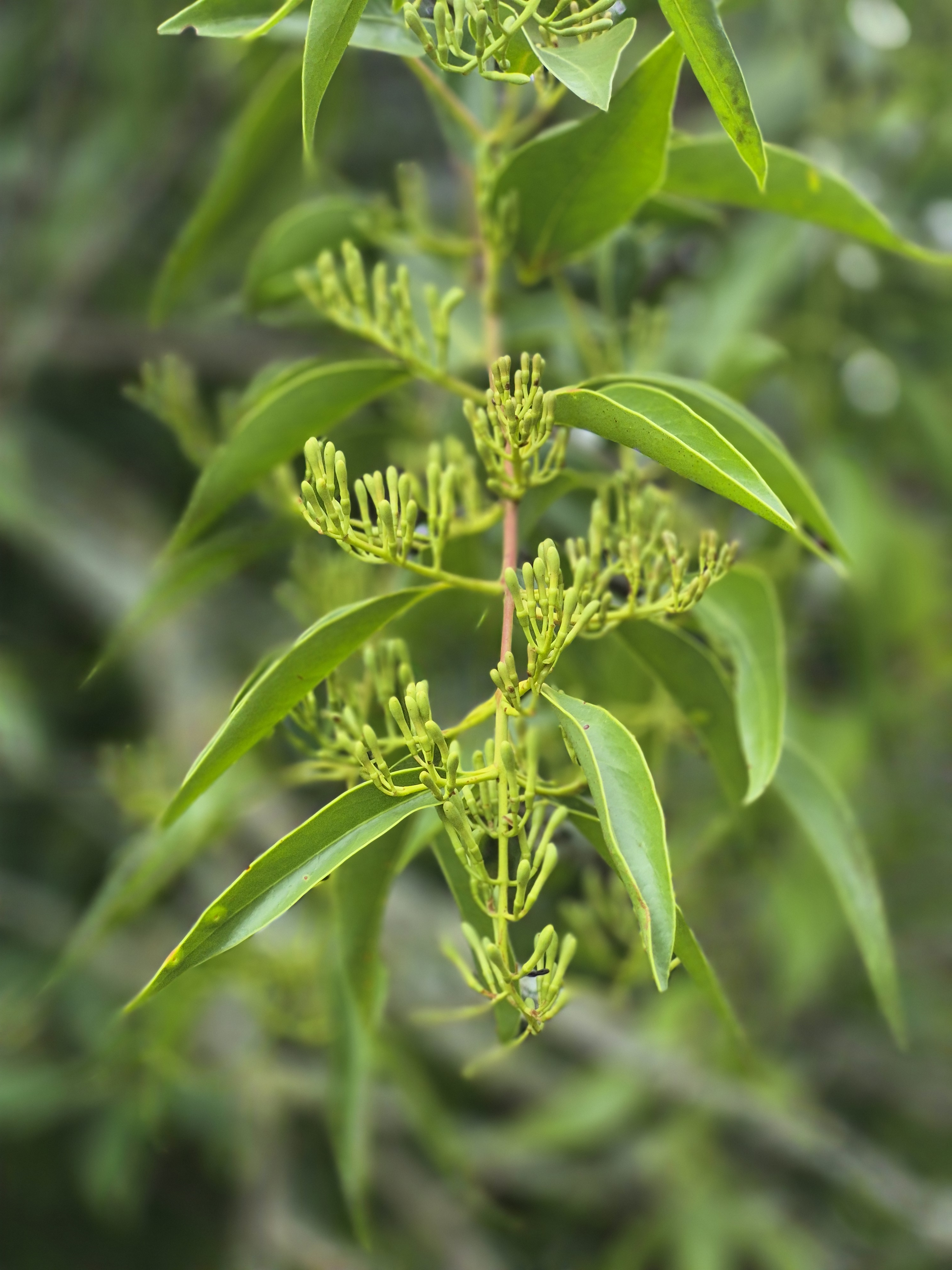
Tripodanthus acutifolius on a tree.

Loranthaceae, commonly known as the showy mistletoes, is a family of flowering plants. It consists of about 75 genera and 1,000 species of woody plants, many of them hemiparasites. The three terrestrial species are Nuytsia floribunda (the Western Australian Christmas tree), Atkinsonia ligustrina (from the Blue Mountains of Australia), and Gaiadendron punctatum (from Central/South America) Loranthaceae are primarily xylem parasites, but their haustoria may sometimes tap the phloem, while Tristerix aphyllus is almost holoparasitic. For a more complete description of the Australian Loranthaceae, see Flora of Australia online, for the Malesian Loranthaceae see Flora of Malesia.

Originally, Loranthaceae contained all mistletoe species, but the mistletoes of Europe and North America (Viscum, Arceuthobium, and Phoradendron) belong to the family Santalaceae. The APG II system 2003 assigns the family to the order Santalales in the clade core eudicots.

== Phylogeny ==
Molecular phylogenetics suggests the following relationships of tribes, subtribes and genera: Nuytsia is sister to the rest of the Loranthaceae, with many characters, including its pollen, its fruit (dry and three winged), and the number of its cotyledons, differing substantially from all other Loranthaceae genera. The root parasitic habit is thought to be the basal condition of the family, with the stem/branch parasitic habit evolving ca. 28-40 million years ago. However, Grimsson et al. (2017) estimate this as occurring somewhat earlier (ca. 40-52 million years ago).

- - Remaining Santalales
  - Loranthaceae
    - - Nuytsieae
        - Nuytsia
      - Gaiadendreae
        - Atkinsonia
        - Gaiadendron
      - Elytrantheae
        - Alepis
        - Amylotheca
        - Cyne
        - Decaisnina
        - Elytranthe
        - Lampas
        - Lepeostegeres
        - Lepidaria
        - Loxanthera
        - Lysiana
        - Macrosolen
        - Peraxilla
        - Trilepidea
        - Thaumasianthes
      - Psittacantheae
        - Tupeinae
          - Tupeia
        - Notantherinae
          - Desmaria
          - Notanthera
        - Ligarinae
          - Ligaria
          - Tristerix
        - Psittacanthinae
          - Aetanthus
          - Cladocolea
          - Dendropemon
          - Maracanthus
          - Oryctanthus
          - Oryctina
          - Panamanthus
          - Passovia
          - Peristethium
          - Phthirusa
          - Psittacanthus
          - Struthanthus
          - Tripodanthus
      - Lorantheae
        - - Ileostylinae
            - Ileostylus
            - Muellerina
          - Loranthinae
            - Cecarria
            - Loranthus
          - Amyeminae
            - Amyema
            - Barathranthus
            - Benthamina
            - Dactyliophora
            - Diplatia
            - Distrianthes
            - Helicanthes
            - Papuanthes
            - Sogerianthe
          - Scurrilinae
            - Scurrula
            - Taxillus
          - Dendrophthoinae
            - Dendrophthoe
            - Helixanthera
            - Tolypanthus
            - Trithecanthera
          - Emelianthinae
            - Emelianthe
            - Erianthemum
            - Globimetula
            - Moquiniella
            - Oliverella
            - Phragmanthera
            - Spragueanella
          - Tapinanthinae
            - Actinanthella
            - Agelanthus
            - Bakerella
            - Berhautia
            - Englerina
            - Oedina
            - Oncella
            - Oncocalyx
            - Pedistylis
            - Plicosepalus
            - Septulina
            - Socratina
            - Tapinanthus
            - Vanwykia

== Genera ==
78 genera are accepted:

- Actinanthella Balle
- Aetanthus (Eichler) Engl.
- Agelanthus Tiegh.
- Alepis Tiegh.
- Amyema Tiegh.
- Amylotheca Tiegh.
- Atkinsonia F.Muell.
- Bakerella Tiegh.
- Barathranthus (Korth.) Miq.
- Benthamina Tiegh.
- Berhautia Balle
- Cecarria Barlow
- Cladocolea Tiegh.
- Cyne Danser
- Dactyliophora Tiegh.
- Decaisnina Tiegh.
- Dendropemon (Blume) Rchb.
- Dendrophthoe Mart.
- Desmaria Tiegh.
- Diplatia Tiegh.
- Distrianthes Danser
- Elytranthe (Blume) Blume
- Emelianthe Danser
- Englerina Tiegh.
- Erianthemum Tiegh.
- Gaiadendron G.Don
- Globimetula Tiegh.
- Helicanthes Danser
- Helixanthera Lour.
- Ileostylus Tiegh.
- Lampas Danser
- Lepeostegeres Blume
- Lepidaria Tiegh.
- Ligaria Tiegh.
- Loranthella S.Blanco & C.E.Wetzel
- Loranthus Jacq.
- Loxanthera (Blume) Blume
- Lysiana Tiegh.
- Macrosolen (Blume) Rchb.
- Maracanthus Kuijt
- Moquiniella Balle
- Muellerina Tiegh.
- Notanthera G.Don
- Nuytsia R.Br. ex G.Don
- Oedina Tiegh.
- Oliverella Tiegh.
- Oncella Tiegh.
- Oncocalyx Tiegh.
- Oryctanthus Eichler
- Oryctina Tiegh.
- Panamanthus Kuijt
- Papuanthes Danser
- Passovia H.Karst.
- Pedistylis Wiens
- Peraxilla Tiegh.
- Peristethium Tiegh.
- Phragmanthera Tiegh.
- Phthirusa Mart.
- Plicosepalus Tiegh.
- Psittacanthus Mart.
- Pusillanthus Kuijt
- Scurrula L.
- Septemeranthus L.J.Singh
- Septulina Tiegh.
- Socratina Balle
- Sogerianthe Danser
- Spragueanella Balle
- Struthanthus Mart.
- Tapinanthus (Blume) Rchb.
- Taxillus Tiegh.
- Thaumasianthes Danser
- Tolypanthus (Blume) Rchb.
- Trilepidea Tiegh.
- Tripodanthus Tiegh.
- Tristerix Mart.
- Trithecanthera Tiegh.
- Tupeia Cham. & Schltdl.
- Vanwykia Wiens

== See also ==
- Parasitic plant
