= List of Santalales of South Africa =

Flowering plants in the order Santalales recorded from South Africa

Santalales is an order of flowering plants. Many of the members of the order are parasitic plants, mostly hemiparasites, able to produce sugars through photosynthesis, but tapping the stems or roots of other plants to obtain water and minerals, though some are obligate parasites, with low concentrations of chlorophyll and derive the majority of their sustenance from their hosts' vascular tissues. Most have seeds without testae (seed coats), which is unusual for flowering plants.

The anthophytes are a grouping of plant taxa bearing flower-like reproductive structures. They were formerly thought to be a clade comprising plants bearing flower-like structures. The group contained the angiosperms - the extant flowering plants, such as roses and grasses - as well as the Gnetales and the extinct Bennettitales.

23,420 species of vascular plant have been recorded in South Africa, making it the sixth most species-rich country in the world and the most species-rich country on the African continent. Of these, 153 species are considered to be threatened. Nine biomes have been described in South Africa: Fynbos, Succulent Karoo, desert, Nama Karoo, grassland, savanna, Albany thickets, the Indian Ocean coastal belt, and forests.

The 2018 South African National Biodiversity Institute's National Biodiversity Assessment plant checklist lists 35,130 taxa in the phyla Anthocerotophyta (hornworts (6)), Anthophyta (flowering plants (33534)), Bryophyta (mosses (685)), Cycadophyta (cycads (42)), Lycopodiophyta (Lycophytes(45)), Marchantiophyta (liverworts (376)), Pinophyta (conifers (33)), and Pteridophyta (cryptogams (408)).

Three families are represented in the literature. Listed taxa include species, subspecies, varieties, and forms as recorded, some of which have subsequently been allocated to other taxa as synonyms, in which cases the accepted taxon is appended to the listing. Multiple entries under alternative names reflect taxonomic revision over time.

== Loranthaceae ==
Family: Loranthaceae,

=== Actinanthella ===
Genus Actinanthella:

- Actinanthella wyliei (Sprague) Wiens, endemic

=== Agelanthus ===
Genus Agelanthus:

- Agelanthus crassifolius (Wiens) Polhill & Wiens, endemic
- Agelanthus gracilis (Toelken & Wiens) Polhill & Wiens, indigenous
- Agelanthus kraussianus (Meisn.) Polhill & Wiens, endemic
- Agelanthus lugardii (N.E.Br.) Polhill & Wiens, indigenous
- Agelanthus natalitius (Meisn.) Polhill & Wiens, indigenous
  - Agelanthus natalitius (Meisn.) Polhill & Wiens subsp. natalitius, indigenous
  - Agelanthus natalitius (Meisn.) Polhill & Wiens subsp. zeyheri (Harv.) Polhill & Wiens, indigenous
- Agelanthus prunifolius (E.Mey. ex Harv.) Polhill & Wiens, endemic
- Agelanthus pungu (De Wild.) Polhill & Wiens, endemic
- Agelanthus sambesiacus (Engl. & Schinz) Polhill & Wiens, endemic
- Agelanthus transvaalensis (Sprague) Polhill & Wiens, indigenous

=== Erianthemum ===
Genus Erianthemum:

- Erianthemum dregei (Eckl. & Zeyh.) Tiegh. indigenous
- Erianthemum ngamicum (Sprague) Danser, indigenous

=== Helixanthera ===
Genus Helixanthera:

- Helixanthera garciana (Engl.) Danser, indigenous
- Helixanthera subcylindrica (Sprague) Danser, accepted as Helixanthera woodii (Schltr. & K.Krause) Danser, present
- Helixanthera woodii (Schltr. & K.Krause) Danser, indigenous

=== Loranthus ===
Genus Loranthus:

- Loranthus natalitius Meisn. var. minor (Harv.) J.M.Wood, accepted as Agelanthus gracilis (Toelken & Wiens) Polhill & Wiens, indigenous

=== Moquinia ===
Genus Moquinia:

- Moquinia rubra A.Spreng. accepted as Moquiniella rubra (A.Spreng.) Balle, indigenous

=== Moquiniella ===
Genus Moquiniella:

- Moquiniella rubra (A.Spreng.) Balle, indigenous

=== Odontella ===
Genus Odontella:

- Odontella welwitschii (Engl.) Balle, accepted as Oncocalyx welwitschii (Engl.) Polhill & Wiens

=== Oncocalyx ===
Genus Oncocalyx:

- Oncocalyx bolusii (Sprague) Wiens & Polhill, indigenous
- Oncocalyx quinquenervius (Hochst.) Wiens & Polhill, endemic

=== Pedistylis ===
Genus Pedistylis:

- Pedistylis galpinii (Schinz ex Sprague) Wiens, indigenous

=== Plicosepalus ===
Genus Plicosepalus:

- Plicosepalus amplexicaulis Wiens, indigenous
- Plicosepalus kalachariensis (Schinz) Danser, indigenous
- Plicosepalus undulatus (E.Mey. ex Harv.) Tiegh. indigenous

=== Septulina ===
Genus Septulina:

- Septulina glauca (Thunb.) Tiegh. indigenous
- Septulina ovalis (E.Mey. ex Harv.) Tiegh. indigenous

=== Tapinanthus ===
Genus Tapinanthus:

- Tapinanthus carsonii (Baker & Sprague) Danser, accepted as Agelanthus pungu (De Wild.) Polhill & Wiens
- Tapinanthus ceciliae (N.E.Br.) Danser, accepted as Agelanthus pungu (De Wild.) Polhill & Wiens, present
- Tapinanthus cinereus (Engl.) Danser, accepted as Phragmanthera cinerea (Engl.) Balle
- Tapinanthus crassifolius Wiens, accepted as Agelanthus crassifolius (Wiens) Polhill & Wiens, present
- Tapinanthus discolor (Schinz) Danser, accepted as Agelanthus discolor (Schinz) Balle
- Tapinanthus forbesii (Sprague) Wiens, indigenous
- Tapinanthus glaucocarpus (Peyr.) Danser, accepted as Phragmanthera glaucocarpa (Peyr.) Balle
- Tapinanthus gracilis Toelken & Wiens, accepted as Agelanthus gracilis (Toelken & Wiens) Polhill & Wiens, present
- Tapinanthus guerichii (Engl.) Danser, accepted as Phragmanthera guerichii (Engl.) Balle
- Tapinanthus kraussianus (Meisn.) Tiegh. subsp. kraussianus, accepted as Agelanthus kraussianus (Meisn.) Polhill & Wiens, present
  - Tapinanthus kraussianus (Meisn.) Tiegh. subsp. transvaalensis (Sprague) Wiens, accepted as Agelanthus transvaalensis (Sprague) Polhill & Wiens, present
- Tapinanthus leendertziae (Sprague) Wiens, accepted as Tapinanthus quequensis (Weim.) Polhill & Wiens, present
- Tapinanthus lugardii (N.E.Br.) Danser, accepted as Agelanthus lugardii (N.E.Br.) Polhill & Wiens, present
- Tapinanthus natalitius (Meisn.) Danser subsp. natalitius, accepted as Agelanthus natalitius (Meisn.) Polhill & Wiens subsp. natalitius, present
  - Tapinanthus natalitius (Meisn.) Danser subsp. zeyheri (Harv.) Wiens, accepted as Agelanthus natalitius (Meisn.) Polhill & Wiens subsp. zeyheri (Harv.) Polhill & Wiens, present
- Tapinanthus oleifolius (J.C.Wendl.) Danser, indigenous
- Tapinanthus prunifolius (E.Mey. ex Harv.) Tiegh. accepted as Agelanthus prunifolius (E.Mey. ex Harv.) Polhill & Wiens, present
- Tapinanthus quequensis (Weim.) Polhill & Wiens, indigenous
- Tapinanthus rubromarginatus (Engl.) Danser, indigenous
- Tapinanthus sambesiacus (Engl. & Schinz) Danser, accepted as Agelanthus sambesiacus (Engl. & Schinz) Polhill & Wiens, present
- Tapinanthus terminaliae (Engl. & Gilg) Danser, accepted as Agelanthus terminaliae (Engl. & Gilg) Polhill & Wiens

=== Tieghemia ===
Genus Tieghemia:

- Tieghemia bolusii (Sprague) Wiens, accepted as Oncocalyx bolusii (Sprague) Wiens & Polhill, present
- Tieghemia quinquenervius (Hochst.) Balle, accepted as Oncocalyx quinquenervius (Hochst.) Wiens & Polhill, present
- Tieghemia rogersii (Sprague ex Burtt Davy) Wiens, accepted as Oncocalyx bolusii (Sprague) Wiens & Polhill, present

=== Vanwykia ===
Genus Vanwykia:

- Vanwykia remota (Baker & Sprague) Wiens, indigenous

== Olacaceae ==
Family: Olacaceae,

=== Olax ===
Genus Olax:

- Olax dissitiflora Oliv. indigenous

=== Ximenia ===
Genus Ximenia:

- Ximenia americana L. indigenous
  - Ximenia americana L. var. microphylla Welw. ex Oliv. indigenous
- Ximenia afra Sond. indigenous
  - Ximenia afra Sond. var. afra, indigenous
  - Ximenia afra Sond. var. natalensis Sond. indigenous

== Santalaceae ==
Family: Santalaceae,

=== Colpoon ===
Genus Colpoon:

- Colpoon compressum P.J.Bergius, indigenous
- Colpoon speciosum (A.W.Hill) P.A.Bean, indigenous

=== Lacomucinaea ===
Genus Lacomucinaea:

- Lacomucinaea lineata (L.f.) Nickrent & M.A.Garcia, indigenous

=== Osyridicarpos ===
Genus Osyridicarpos:

- Osyridicarpos schimperianus (Hochst. ex A.Rich.) A.DC. indigenous

=== Osyris ===
Genus Osyris:

- Osyris compressa (P.J.Bergius) A.DC. accepted as Colpoon compressum P.J.Bergius, indigenous
- Osyris lanceolata Hochst. & Steud. indigenous
- Osyris speciosa (A.W.Hill) J.C.Manning & Goldblatt, accepted as Colpoon speciosum (A.W.Hill) P.A.Bean, endemic

=== Rhoiacarpos ===
Genus Rhoiacarpos:

- Rhoiacarpos capensis (Harv.) A.DC. endemic

=== Thesidium ===
Genus Thesidium:

- Thesidium exocarpaeoides Sond. accepted as Thesium microcarpum A.DC. indigenous
- Thesidium fragile (Thunb.) Sond. accepted as Thesium confusum J.C.Manning & F.Forest, endemic
- Thesidium fruticulosum A.W.Hill, accepted as Thesium fruticulosum (A.W.Hill) J.C.Manning & F.Forest, endemic
- Thesidium globosum (A.DC.) A.DC. accepted as Thesium strigulosum A.DC. indigenous
- Thesidium hirtum Sond. accepted as Thesium strigulosum A.DC. endemic
- Thesidium leptostachyum (A.DC.) Sond. accepted as Thesium leptostachyum A.DC. endemic
- Thesidium longifolium A.W.Hill, accepted as Thesium fruticulosum (A.W.Hill) J.C.Manning & F.Forest, indigenous
- Thesidium microcarpum (A.DC.) A.DC. accepted as Thesium microcarpum A.DC. indigenous
- Thesidium minus A.W.Hill, accepted as Thesium fruticulosum (A.W.Hill) J.C.Manning & F.Forest, indigenous
- Thesidium podocarpum (A.DC.) A.DC. accepted as Thesium fragile L.f. indigenous
- Thesidium thunbergii Sond. accepted as Thesium fragile L.f. indigenous

=== Thesium ===
Genus Thesium:

- Thesium abietinum Schltr. accepted as Thesium imbricatum Thunb. present
- Thesium acuminatum A.W.Hill, endemic
- Thesium acutissimum A.DC. indigenous
- Thesium affine Schltr. accepted as Thesium quinqueflorum Sond. present
- Thesium aggregatum A.W.Hill, endemic
- Thesium alatum Hilliard & B.L.Burtt, indigenous
- Thesium albomontanum Compton, endemic
- Thesium angulosum DC. endemic
- Thesium annulatum A.W.Hill, endemic
- Thesium archeri Compton, endemic
- Thesium aristatum Schltr. accepted as Thesium spinulosum A.DC. present
- Thesium asperifolium A.W.Hill, endemic
- Thesium asterias A.W.Hill, indigenous
- Thesium bathyschistum Schltr. endemic
- Thesium boissierianum A.DC. endemic
- Thesium brachygyne Schltr. endemic
- Thesium breyeri N.E.Br. indigenous
- Thesium burchellii A.W.Hill, indigenous
- Thesium burkei A.W.Hill, accepted as Thesium resedoides A.W.Hill, indigenous
- Thesium capitatum L. endemic
- Thesium capitellatum A.DC. endemic
- Thesium capituliflorum Sond. endemic
- Thesium carinatum A.DC. indigenous
  - Thesium carinatum A.DC. var. carinatum, endemic
  - Thesium carinatum A.DC. var. pallidum A.W.Hill, endemic
- Thesium celatum N.E.Br. indigenous
- Thesium commutatum Sond. endemic
- Thesium confine Sond. indigenous
- Thesium confusum J.C.Manning & F.Forest, endemic
- Thesium congestum R.A.Dyer, indigenous
- Thesium conostylum Schltr. accepted as Thesium hispidulum Lam. ex Sond. var. subglabrum A.W.Hill, present
- Thesium cordatum A.W.Hill, indigenous
- Thesium coriarium A.W.Hill, indigenous
- Thesium cornigerum A.W.Hill, endemic
- Thesium corymbuligerum Sond. accepted as Thesium virgatum Lam. present
- Thesium costatum A.W.Hill, indigenous
  - Thesium costatum A.W.Hill var. costatum, indigenous
  - Thesium costatum A.W.Hill var. juniperinum A.W.Hill, indigenous
  - Thesium costatum A.W.Hill var. paniculatum N.E.Br. indigenous
- Thesium crassifolium Sond. endemic
- Thesium cupressoides A.W.Hill, indigenous
- Thesium cymosum A.W.Hill, indigenous
- Thesium cytisoides A.W.Hill, accepted as Thesium utile A.W.Hill, present
- Thesium davidsonae Brenan, endemic
- Thesium deceptum N.E.Br. endemic
- Thesium decipiens Hilliard & B.L.Burtt, indigenous
- Thesium densiflorum A.DC. endemic
- Thesium densum N.E.Br. endemic
- Thesium disciflorum A.W.Hill, endemic
- Thesium disparile N.E.Br. endemic
- Thesium dissitiflorum Schltr. endemic
- Thesium diversifolium Sond. endemic
- Thesium dumale N.E.Br. accepted as Thesium resedoides A.W.Hill, endemic
- Thesium durum Hilliard & B.L.Burtt, indigenous
- Thesium ecklonianum Sond. endemic
- Thesium elatius Sond. endemic
- Thesium ephedroides A.W.Hill, accepted as Lacomucinaea lineata (L.f.) Nickrent & M.A.Garcia
- Thesium equisetoides Welw. ex Hiern, indigenous
- Thesium ericaefolium A.DC. endemic
- Thesium euphorbioides L. endemic
- Thesium euphrasioides A.DC. endemic
- Thesium exile N.E.Br. endemic
- Thesium fallax Schltr. endemic
- Thesium fimbriatum A.W.Hill, endemic
- Thesium flexuosum A.DC. endemic
- Thesium foliosum A.DC. endemic
- Thesium fragile L.f. endemic
- Thesium fragile Link ex A.DC. accepted as Thesium crassifolium Sond. present
  - Thesium frisea L. var. frisea, endemic
  - Thesium frisea L. var. thunbergii A.DC. endemic
- Thesium fructicosum A.W.Hill, endemic
- Thesium fruticulosum (A.W.Hill) J.C.Manning & F.Forest, endemic
- Thesium funale L. endemic
- Thesium galioides A.DC. endemic
- Thesium glaucescens A.W.Hill, endemic
- Thesium globosum A.DC. accepted as Thesium strigulosum A.DC. indigenous
- Thesium glomeratum A.W.Hill, endemic
- Thesium glomeruliflorum Sond. endemic
- Thesium gnidiaceum A.DC. indigenous
  - Thesium gnidiaceum A.DC. var. gnidiaceum, endemic
  - Thesium gnidiaceum A.DC. var. zeyheri Sond. endemic
- Thesium goetzeanum Engl. indigenous
- Thesium gracilarioides A.W.Hill, indigenous
- Thesium gracile A.W.Hill, indigenous
- Thesium gracilentum N.E.Br. indigenous
- Thesium griseum Sond. indigenous
- Thesium gypsophiloides A.W.Hill, indigenous
- Thesium helichrysoides A.W.Hill, accepted as Thesium penicillatum A.W.Hill, present
- Thesium hillianum Compton, endemic
- Thesium hirsutum A.W.Hill, endemic
- Thesium hispidulum Lam. ex Sond. indigenous
  - Thesium hispidulum Lam. ex Sond. var. hispidulum, endemic
  - Thesium hispidulum Lam. ex Sond. var. subglabrum A.W.Hill, endemic
- Thesium hispidum Schltr. accepted as Thesium hispidulum Lam. ex Sond. var. hispidulum, present
- Thesium hollandii Compton, endemic
- Thesium horridum Pilg. endemic
- Thesium hystricoides A.W.Hill, indigenous
- Thesium hystrix A.W.Hill, indigenous
- Thesium imbricatum Thunb. indigenous
- Thesium impeditum A.W.Hill, indigenous
- Thesium inversum N.E.Br. endemic
- Thesium jeanae Brenan, indigenous
- Thesium junceum Bernh. indigenous
  - Thesium junceum Bernh. var. junceum, endemic
  - Thesium junceum Bernh. var. mammosum A.W.Hill, endemic
  - Thesium junceum Bernh. var. plantagineum A.W.Hill, endemic
- Thesium juncifolium DC. endemic
- Thesium junodii A.W.Hill, endemic
- Thesium karooicum Compton, endemic
- Thesium lacinulatum A.W.Hill, indigenous
- Thesium leptocaule Sond. endemic
- Thesium leptostachyum A.DC. endemic
- Thesium lesliei N.E.Br. indigenous
- Thesium lineatum L.f. accepted as Lacomucinaea lineata (L.f.) Nickrent & M.A.Garcia, indigenous
- Thesium lisae-mariae Stauffer, endemic
- Thesium litoreum Brenan, endemic
- Thesium lobelioides A.DC. indigenous
- Thesium macrogyne A.W.Hill, indigenous
- Thesium macrostachyum A.DC. endemic
- Thesium magalismontanum Sond. indigenous
- Thesium marlothii Schltr. endemic
- Thesium maximiliani Schltr. accepted as Thesium rariflorum Sond. present
- Thesium megalocarpum A.W.Hill, indigenous
- Thesium microcarpum A.DC. endemic
- Thesium microcephalum A.W.Hill, endemic
- Thesium micromeria A.DC. endemic
- Thesium micropogon A.DC. endemic
- Thesium minus (A.W.Hill) J.C.Manning & F.Forest, endemic
- Thesium mossii N.E.Br. endemic
- Thesium multiramulosum Pilg. indigenous
- Thesium namaquense Schltr. endemic
- Thesium natalense Sond. indigenous
- Thesium nationae A.W.Hill, endemic
- Thesium nigromontanum Sond. endemic
- Thesium nigrum A.W.Hill, indigenous
- Thesium nudicaule A.W.Hill, endemic
- Thesium occidentale A.W.Hill, endemic
- Thesium oresigenum Compton, endemic
- Thesium orientale A.W.Hill, endemic
- Thesium pallidum A.DC. indigenous
- Thesium paniculatum L. endemic
- Thesium paronychioides Sond. endemic
- Thesium patersoniae A.W.Hill, endemic
- Thesium patulum A.W.Hill, endemic
- Thesium penicillatum A.W.Hill, endemic
- Thesium phyllostachyum Sond. endemic
- Thesium pinifolium A.DC. endemic
- Thesium pleuroloma A.W.Hill, endemic
- Thesium podocarpum A.DC. accepted as Thesium fragile L.f. indigenous
- Thesium polycephalum Schltr. endemic
- Thesium polygaloides A.W.Hill, endemic
- Thesium pottiae N.E.Br. indigenous
- Thesium procerum N.E.Br. indigenous
- Thesium prostratum A.W.Hill, endemic
- Thesium pseudovirgatum Levyns, endemic
- Thesium pubescens A.DC. endemic
- Thesium pungens A.W.Hill, endemic
- Thesium pycnanthum Schltr. endemic
- Thesium quinqueflorum Sond. endemic
- Thesium racemosum Bernh. indigenous
- Thesium rariflorum Sond. endemic
- Thesium rasum (A.W.Hill) N.E.Br. indigenous
- Thesium repandum A.W.Hill, endemic
- Thesium resedoides A.W.Hill, indigenous
- Thesium resinifolium N.E.Br. endemic
- Thesium rigidum Sond. indigenous
- Thesium rogersii A.W.Hill, accepted as Thesium goetzeanum Engl. indigenous
- Thesium rufescens A.W.Hill, endemic
- Thesium scabrum L. endemic
- Thesium scandens E.Mey. ex Sond. endemic
- Thesium schumannianum Schltr. endemic
- Thesium scirpioides A.W.Hill, indigenous
- Thesium sedifolium A.DC. ex Levyns, accepted as Thesium crassifolium Sond. present
- Thesium selagineum A.DC. endemic
- Thesium semotum N.E.Br. endemic
- Thesium sertulariastrum A.W.Hill, endemic
- Thesium sonderianum Schltr. endemic
- Thesium spartioides A.W.Hill, indigenous
- Thesium spicatum L. endemic
- Thesium spinosum L.f. endemic
- Thesium spinulosum A.DC. endemic
- Thesium squarrosum L.f. indigenous
- Thesium strictum P.J.Bergius, endemic
- Thesium strigulosum A.DC. endemic
- Thesium subnudum Sond. indigenous
  - Thesium subnudum Sond. var. foliosum A.W.Hill, endemic
  - Thesium subnudum Sond. var. subnudum, endemic
- Thesium subsimile N.E.Br. endemic
- Thesium susannae A.W.Hill, endemic
- Thesium thunbergianum A.DC. accepted as Thesium selagineum A.DC. present
- Thesium translucens A.W.Hill, endemic
- Thesium transvaalense Schltr. endemic
- Thesium triflorum Thunb. ex L.f. indigenous
- Thesium umbelliferum A.W.Hill, endemic
- Thesium urceolatum A.W.Hill, endemic
- Thesium utile A.W.Hill, indigenous
- Thesium vahrmeijeri Brenan, endemic
- Thesium virens E.Mey. ex A.DC. endemic
- Thesium virgatum Lam. endemic
- Thesium viridifolium Levyns, endemic
- Thesium viscibaccatum Dinter, accepted as Lacomucinaea lineata (L.f.) Nickrent & M.A.Garcia
- Thesium whitehillensis Compton, endemic
- Thesium zeyheri A.DC. indigenous

=== Viscum ===
Genus Viscum:

- Viscum anceps E.Mey. ex Sprague, endemic
- Viscum capense L.f. indigenous
  - Viscum capense L.f. subsp. hoolei Wiens, accepted as Viscum hoolei Wiens, present
- Viscum combreticola Engl. indigenous
- Viscum continuum E.Mey. ex Sprague, endemic
- Viscum crassulae Eckl. & Zeyh. endemic
- Viscum dielsianum Dinter ex Neusser, indigenous
- Viscum hoolei Wiens, indigenous
- Viscum menyharthii Engl. & Schinz, indigenous
- Viscum minimum Harv. endemic
- Viscum nervosum Hochst. ex A.Rich. accepted as Viscum triflorum DC.
- Viscum obovatum Harv. indigenous
- Viscum obscurum Thunb. indigenous
- Viscum oreophilum Wiens, indigenous
- Viscum pauciflorum L.f. endemic
- Viscum rotundifolium L.f. indigenous
- Viscum schaeferi Engl. & K.Krause, indigenous
- Viscum spragueanum Burtt Davy, accepted as Viscum tuberculatum A.Rich. present
- Viscum subserratum Schltr. indigenous
- Viscum triflorum DC. indigenous
  - Viscum triflorum DC. subsp. nervosum (Hochst. ex A.Rich.) M.G.Gilbert, accepted as Viscum triflorum DC. present
- Viscum tuberculatum A.Rich. indigenous
- Viscum verrucosum Harv. indigenous
