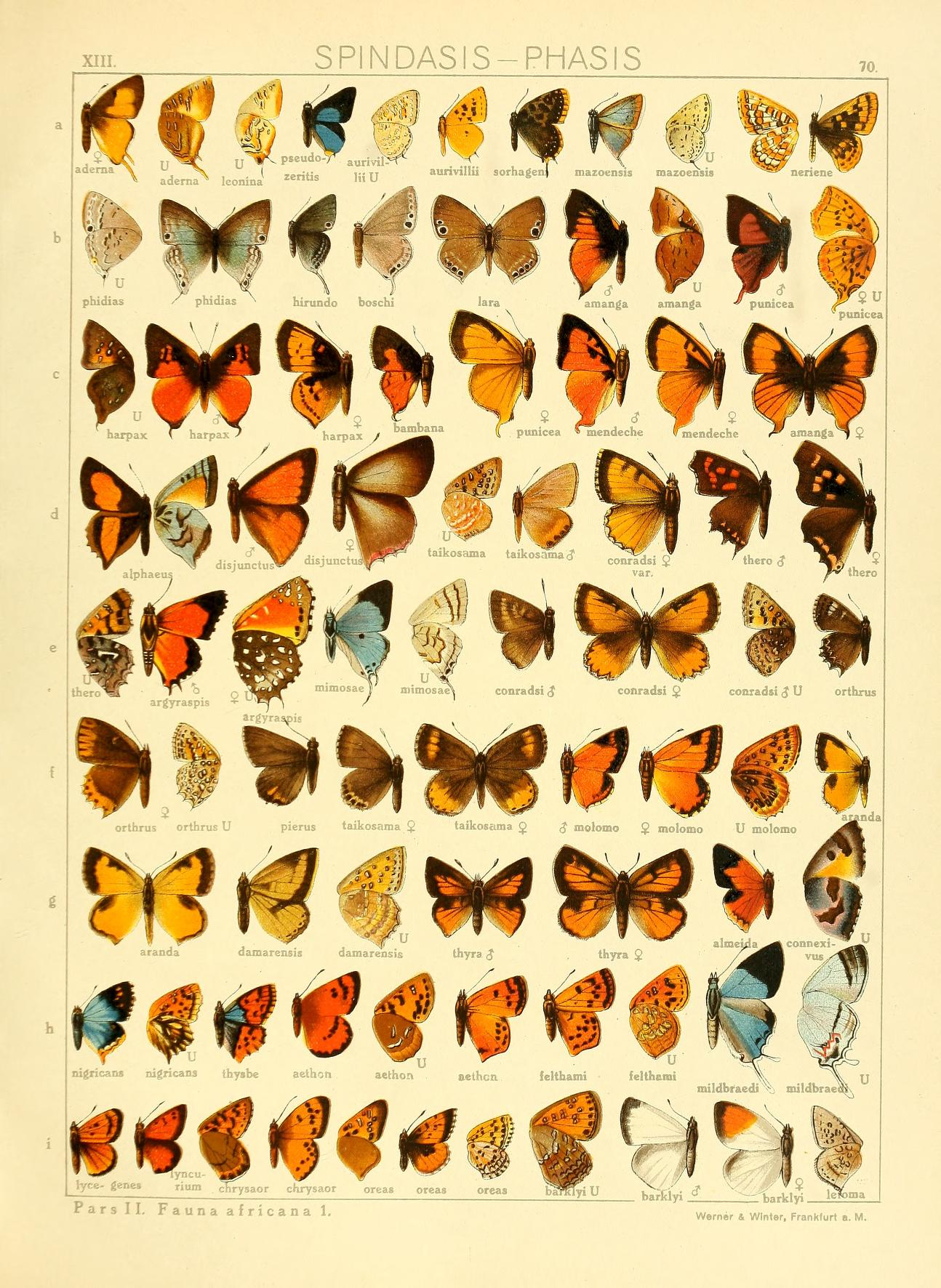

Scientific classification
- Kingdom: Animalia
- Phylum: Arthropoda
- Class: Insecta
- Order: Lepidoptera
- Family: Lycaenidae
- Genus: Iolaus
- Species: I. mimosae

Binomial name
- Iolaus mimosae Trimen, 1874

Synonyms
- Epamera berbera Bethune-Baker, 1924; Epamera mimosae septentrionalis Stempffer, 1948; Epamera tajoraca haemus Talbot, 1935; Epamera mimosae pamelae Dickson, 1976; Epamera mimosae rhodosense Stempffer & Bennett, 1959

= Iolaus mimosae =

Species of butterfly

Iolaus mimosae, the mimosa sapphire, is a butterfly of the family Lycaenidae. It is found in southern Africa. The habitat consists of Karoo and savanna.

The wingspan is 26–31 mm for males and 30–32 mm for females. Adults are on wing from September to March with a peak from October to November. There are one or more generations per year.

The larvae feed on Actinanthella wyliei, Agelanthus natalitius, Moquinella rubra, Oncocalyx fischeri, Plicosepalus curviflorus, Plicosepalus kalachariensis and Tapinanthus dichrous.

== Subspecies ==
- Iolaus mimosae mimosae (South Africa: Eastern Cape)
- Iolaus mimosae berbera (Bethune-Baker, 1924) (Somalia, Ethiopia)
- Iolaus mimosae haemus (Talbot, 1935) (north-western Kenya, eastern Uganda)
- Iolaus mimosae pamelae (Dickson, 1976) (northern Namibia)
- Iolaus mimosae rhodosense (Stempffer & Bennett, 1959) (eastern Kenya, Tanzania, Malawi, southern Zambia, Mozambique, Zimbabwe, eastern Botswana, Swaziland, South Africa: Limpopo, Mpumalanga, North West, Gauteng, KwaZulu-Natal)
