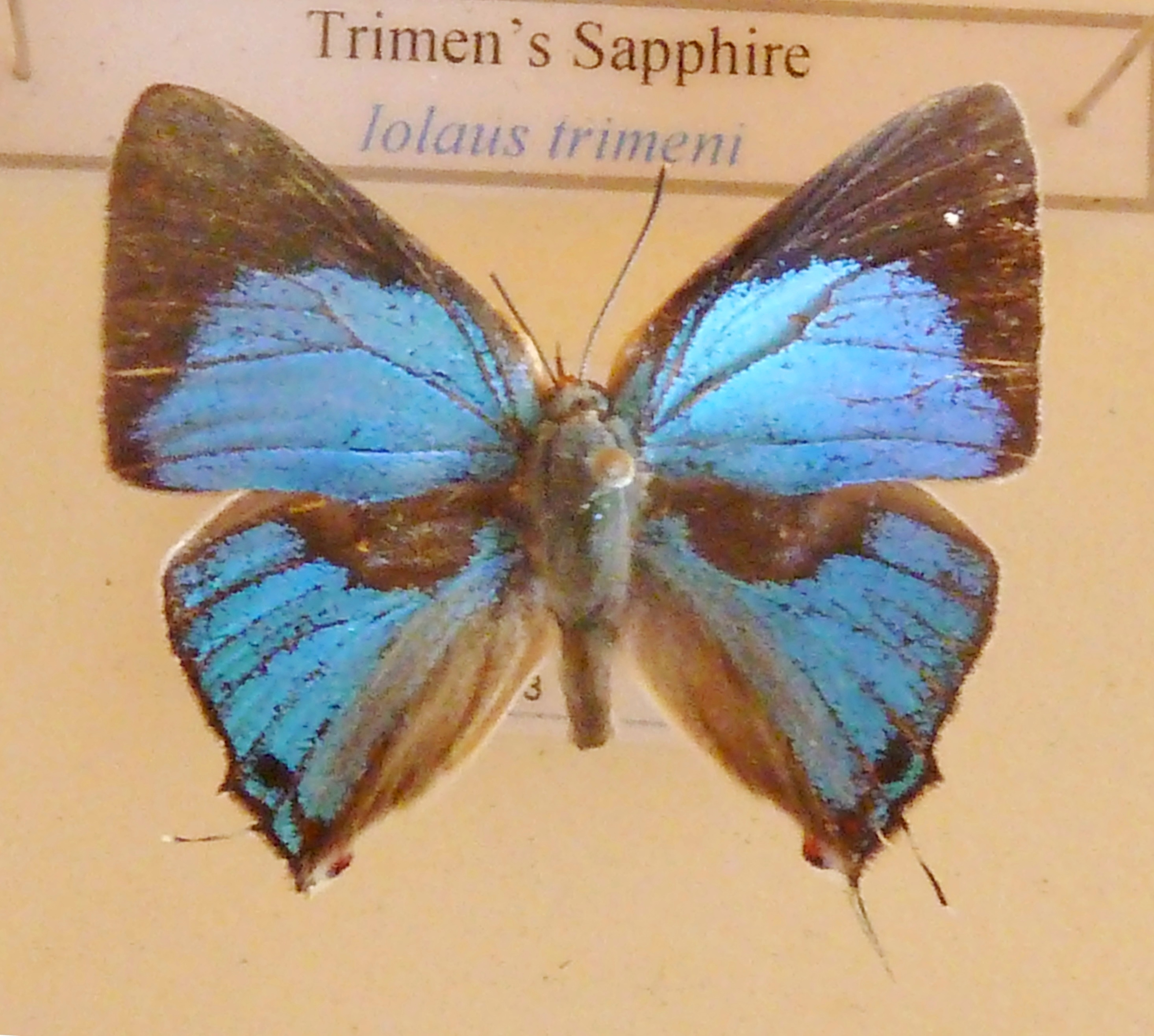

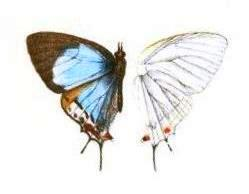

Conservation status
- Least Concern (IUCN 3.1)

Scientific classification
- Kingdom: Animalia
- Phylum: Arthropoda
- Class: Insecta
- Order: Lepidoptera
- Family: Lycaenidae
- Genus: Iolaus
- Species: I. trimeni

Binomial name
- Iolaus trimeni Wallengren, 1875

Synonyms
- Jolaus trimeni Wallengren, 1875; Iolaus anesius Hulstaert, 1924

= Iolaus trimeni =

Trimen's sapphire

Species of butterfly

Iolaus trimeni, the Trimen's sapphire, is a butterfly of the family Lycaenidae. It is found in the southern Democratic Republic of the Congo, south-eastern Angola, Zambia, Tanzania, Malawi, Zimbabwe, Mozambique, Swaziland and South Africa. In South Africa it is found from northern KwaZulu-Natal to Mpumalanga, Gauteng and the North West province.

The wingspan is 34–40 mm for males and 36–42 mm for females. Adults are on the wing year round in warmer areas. In the cooler western part of its range there is a peak from September to January.

The larvae feed on Tapinanthus oleifolius, T. quinquangulus, T. rubromarginatus and T. subulatus.
