= Tapinanthus letouzeyi =

Conservation status
- Vulnerable (IUCN 2.3)

Scientific classification
- Kingdom: Plantae
- Clade: Tracheophytes
- Clade: Angiosperms
- Clade: Eudicots
- Order: Santalales
- Family: Loranthaceae
- Genus: Tapinanthus
- Species: T. letouzeyi

Binomial name
- Tapinanthus letouzeyi (Balle) R.M. Polhill & D. Wiens

Species of mistletoe

Tapinanthus letouzeyi is a species of plant in the family Loranthaceae. It is endemic to Cameroon. Its natural habitat is subtropical or tropical dry forests. It is threatened by habitat loss.
