= Osyris daruma =

Scientific classification
- Kingdom: Plantae
- Clade: Tracheophytes
- Clade: Angiosperms
- Clade: Eudicots
- Order: Santalales
- Family: Santalaceae
- Genus: Osyris
- Species: O. daruma

Binomial name
- Osyris daruma Parsa

Species of flowering plant

Osyris daruma is a species of plant in the family Santalaceae.

The name of Osyris daruma is derived from the Greek word ozos which means branches, as this tree is bushy in nature and multi stemmed. The name is related to the coastal species. The small tree of Osyris daruma is distinguished as opposite leaves and terminal flower head.

== Plant description ==
This is African Sandalwood which is used for its scented wood and to extract essential oil which is used in various things cosmetics as well as medicinal purpose. This hemi-parasitic plant is found in East Africa. This is a rare plant which only found in Africa not on any other continents. This species of sandalwood which is unlike other sandalwood tree as it is a short tree. Many herbal products like lotion, cream, shampoo perfume are made by Sandalwood.

== Characteristics ==
O. daruma is one of the larger African sandalwoods. It is a multi-stem and an evergreen hardy shrub spread very largely but a small tree. It has smooth, dark brown to blackish bark, with young branches in brownish colour. The leaves are alternate, about 13–50 mm long, sharp-pointed, blue green, often with a waxy bloom, smooth, thick and leathery. The flowers are yellowish green in colour. The time of flowering starts from September and ends in February. The fruit which starts ripening in early May to September are fleshy, small and yellow in color. After ripening the fruits become bright red to purple black in colour. The tree grows up to 26m high. This plant is highly aromatic in nature as well as used in various medicinal purposes. The bark, stems and branches all have different uses.

== Areas ==
This sandalwood is mainly found in South Africa to Zimbabwe and the eastern parts of Africa. It grows in the rocky areas or along the margins of dry forest but usually not abundant to any particular area.

== Conservation ==
This species of sandalwood is not a part of endangered, critically endangered or vulnerable species.

== Osyris daruma ==
This semi parasitic plant which gets the nourishment from his host plant but it photosynthesis also. It grows in the rocky areas and dry forests of eastern parts of Africa. These species of sandalwood also found in southern parts of Africa. It’s a large, multi-stemmed, evergreen hardy shrub or small tree, 2–6 m high.

== Growth ==
This African sandalwood grows from the seeds in the natural veld. During the plantation the seeds must be sown fresh to the ground. There is no pretreatment of the plant is necessary during the plantation of it. But if the seeds are sown perfectly according or in the favorable conditions, seeds germination can reach 60% just after 6 weeks. This plant needs special attention as the plant needs well drained clays or deep loans in the shady area, especially when still in early growth stage. These plants grow very slowly but highly adaptable to frost as well as drought. The propagation of the plant is done through air layering. Air layering is the process of removing a large branch or section of the trunk of a tree to create another tree.

== Propagation ==
Propagation of African sandalwood (Osyris daruma Parsa) by air layering was investigated, aiming at providing an alternative propagation technique to the use of seeds or cuttings that germinate or root poorly. Air layers were initiated on the young shoots 1–2 years old of mature O. daruma trees growing in catchment Forest. After root initiation, which took 8 weeks, they were detached from the parents, potted in polyethylene tubes and reared at the nursery for a further three months. The factors assessed in this experiment were the effect of time at which air layers were initiated and the influence of IBA as rooting promoter at three concentrations (50, 100 and 150 ppm). From the data collected it was observed that rooting success of up to 80% can be achieved from air layers, making this propagation technique a viable alternative to seedlings or cutting propagation. Rooting success was influenced by both the season and application of rooting hormone with optimal rooting being achieved during June and September with the addition of IBA at a rate of 50 ppm. The significance increase in root ability of air layers during June and September may be linked to the advantage of the dry season where reduction of plant development activities such as budding, leafing and flowering in the dormant dry season might have reduced resource competition and thus promoting the observed rooting.
