= Tapinanthus preussii =

Conservation status
- Vulnerable (IUCN 3.1)

Scientific classification
- Kingdom: Plantae
- Clade: Tracheophytes
- Clade: Angiosperms
- Clade: Eudicots
- Order: Santalales
- Family: Loranthaceae
- Genus: Tapinanthus
- Species: T. preussii

Binomial name
- Tapinanthus preussii (Engl.) Tiegh.

Synonyms
- Loranthus preussii Engl.; Loranthus pachycaulis Engl. & K.Krause

Species of mistletoe

Tapinanthus preussii is a species of plant in the family Loranthaceae. It is found in Angola, Cameroon, Gabon, and Nigeria. Its natural habitat is subtropical or tropical moist lowland forests. It is threatened by habitat loss.
