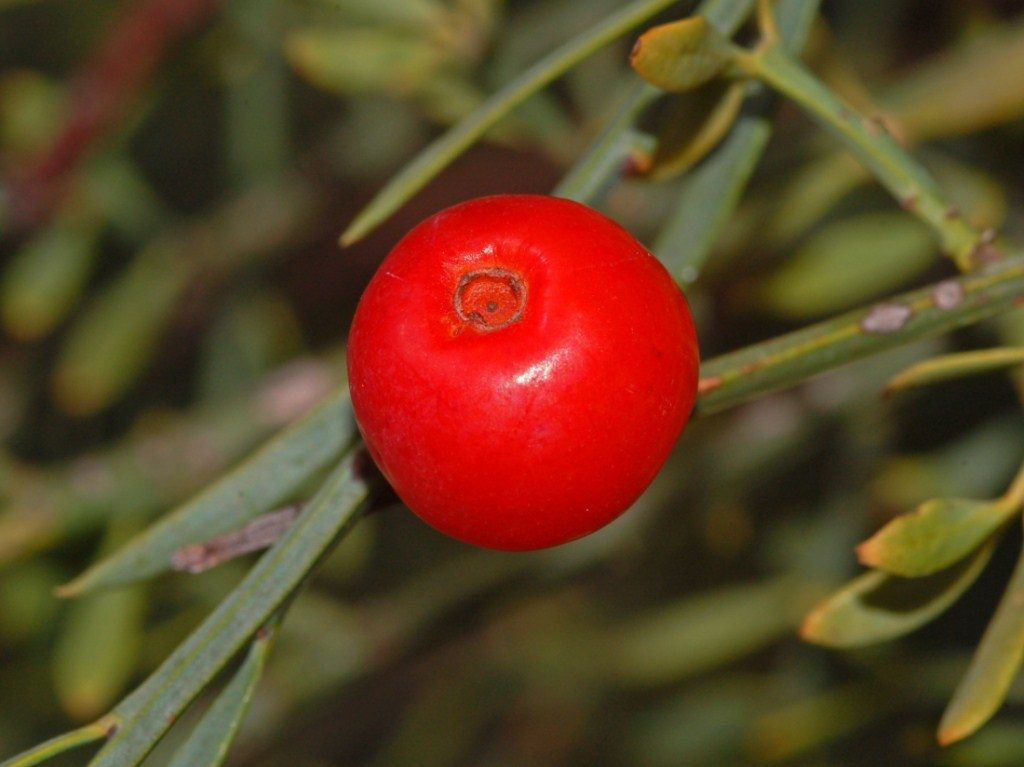
- Fruit of Osyris alba

Scientific classification
- Kingdom: Plantae
- Clade: Embryophytes
- Clade: Tracheophytes
- Clade: Angiosperms
- Clade: Eudicots
- Order: Santalales
- Family: Santalaceae
- Genus: Osyris
- Species: O. alba

Binomial name
- Osyris alba L.

Synonyms
- Osyris lanceolata var. moroderorum Pau & Sennen; Osyris mediterranea Bubani

= Osyris alba =

Species of flowering plant

Osyris alba, common name osyris, is a small perennial plant in the genus Osyris belonging to the Santalaceae family.

== Description ==
Osyris alba is a semiparasitic (hemiparasitic) broom-like shrub reaching 30–150 cm (12–59 in) in height. The stem is woody, brown or dark green, sometimes creeping on the ground. This plant has numerous longitudinally striated branches, green when young. The leaves are linear, lanceolate, coriaceous, and persistent, although sometimes deciduous. They are about 15–35 mm (0.59–1.38 in) long and 1–5 mm (0.039–0.197 in) wide. They are produced during the winter, while in summer they are almost totally absent. The flowers are hermaphroditic or unisexual; in the latter case, the male and female flowers show differences associated with the timing of pollination. They are very small (1 or 2 mm), with four yellow-green tepals and four stamens. Flowering period extends from March to June. The fruits are small, red, fleshy drupes, 4–6 mm (0.16–0.24 in) in diameter. Their roots form haustoria that tap into the roots of nearby plants and extract their sap.

== Distribution ==
The species is widespread in all countries of the Mediterranean basin, from Portugal to Turkey. It is present in western Asia and in North Africa from Morocco to Tunisia and Libya.

== Gallery ==
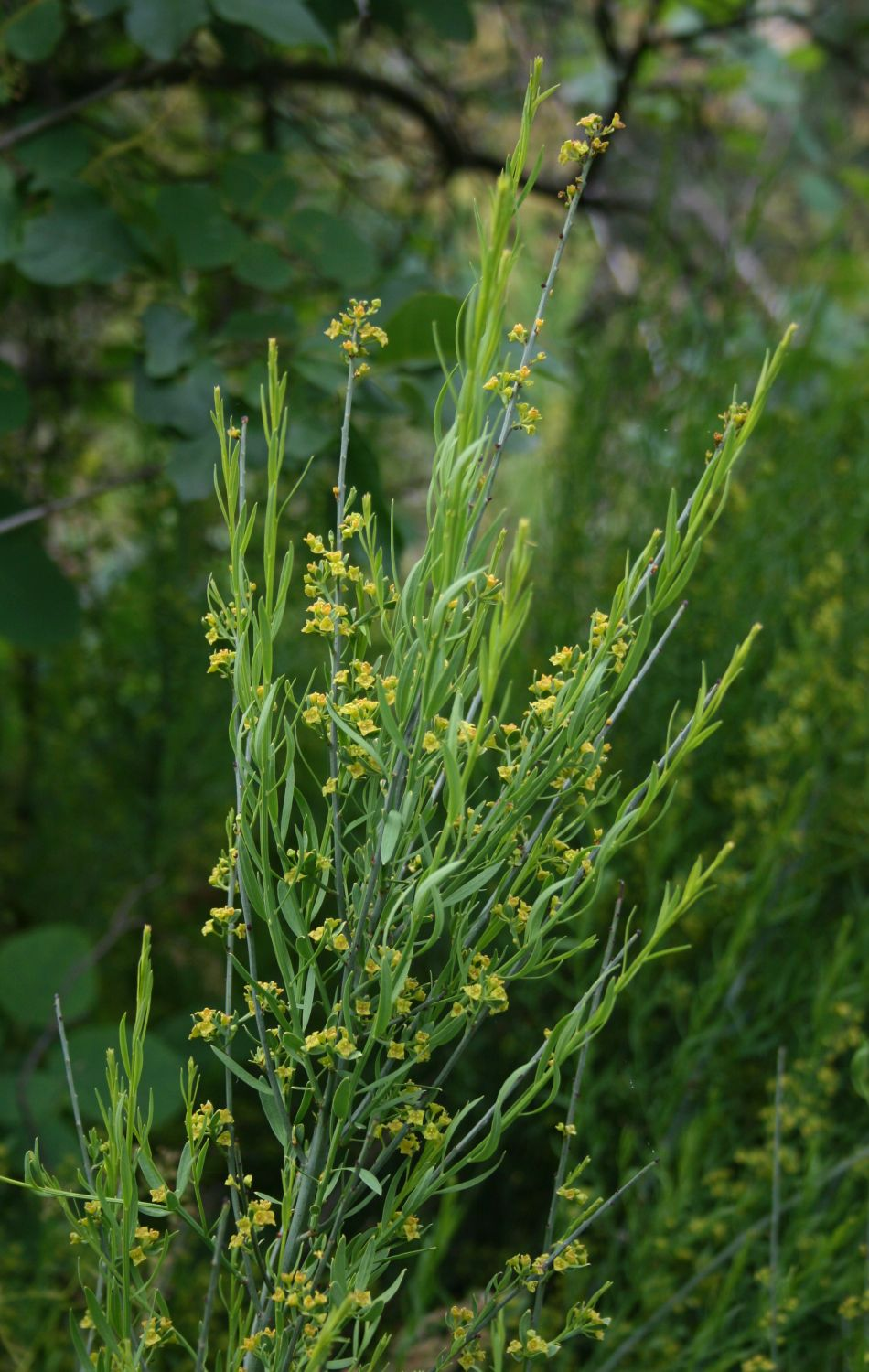
Plant of O. alba

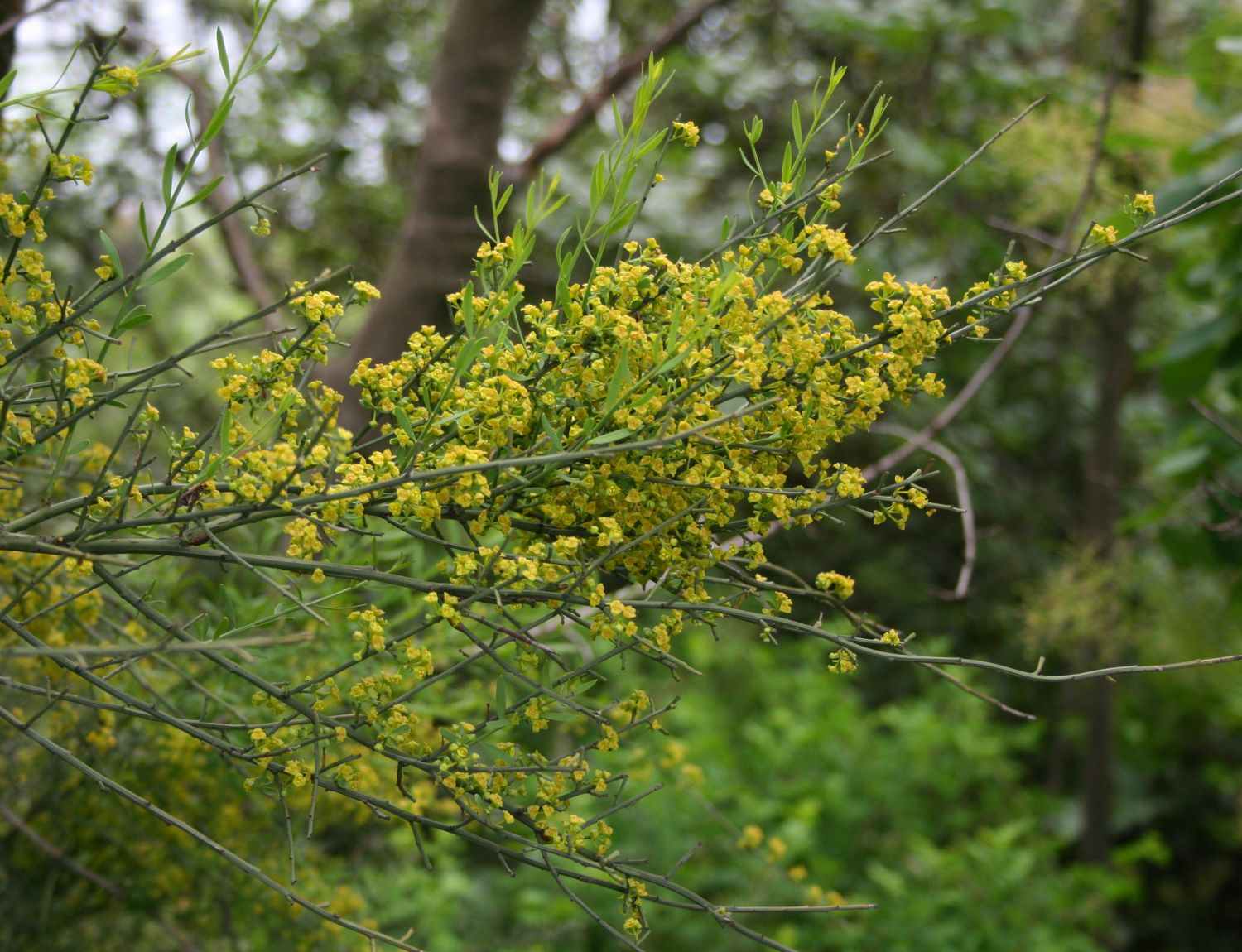
In bloom

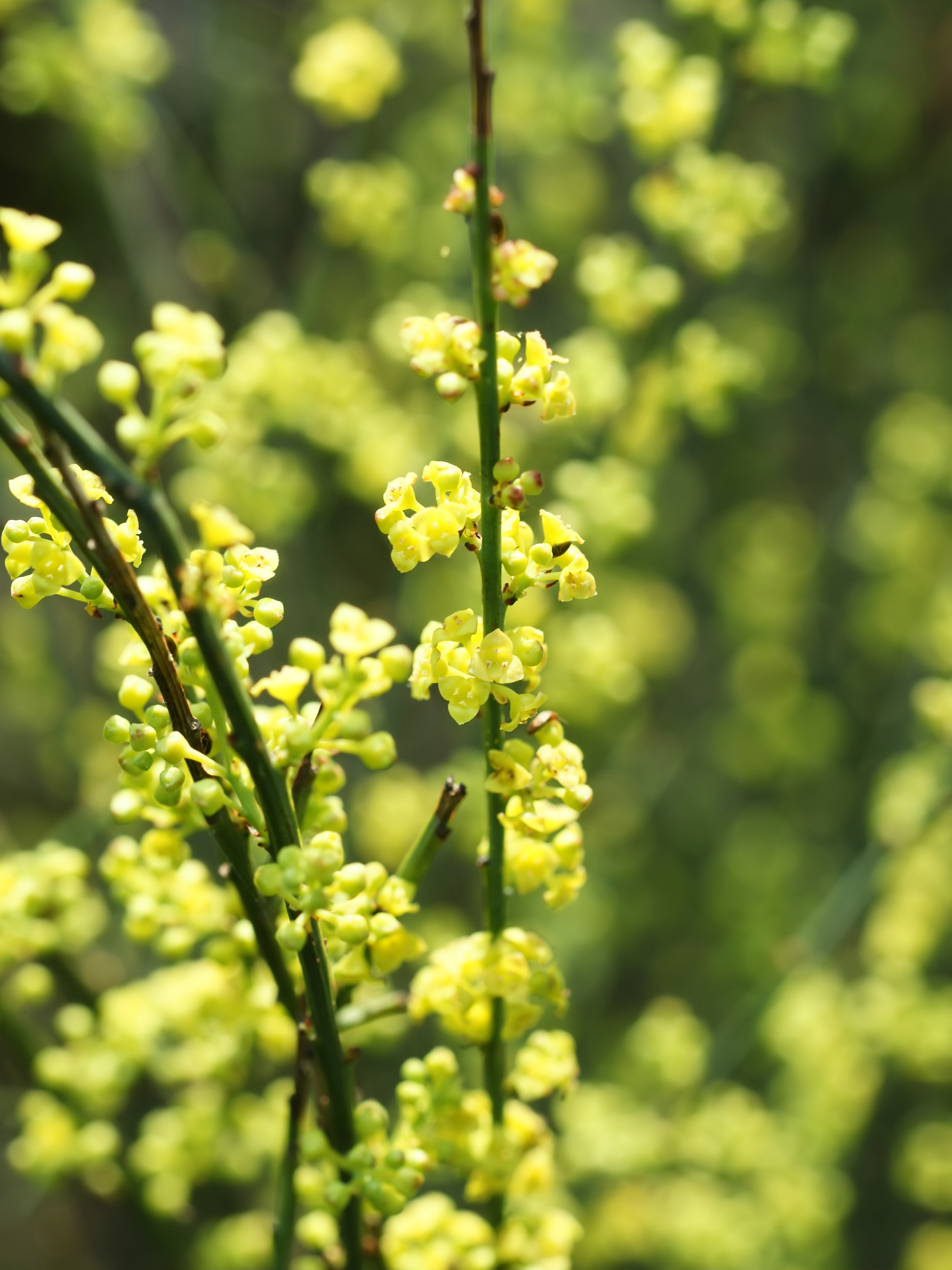
Flowers spike

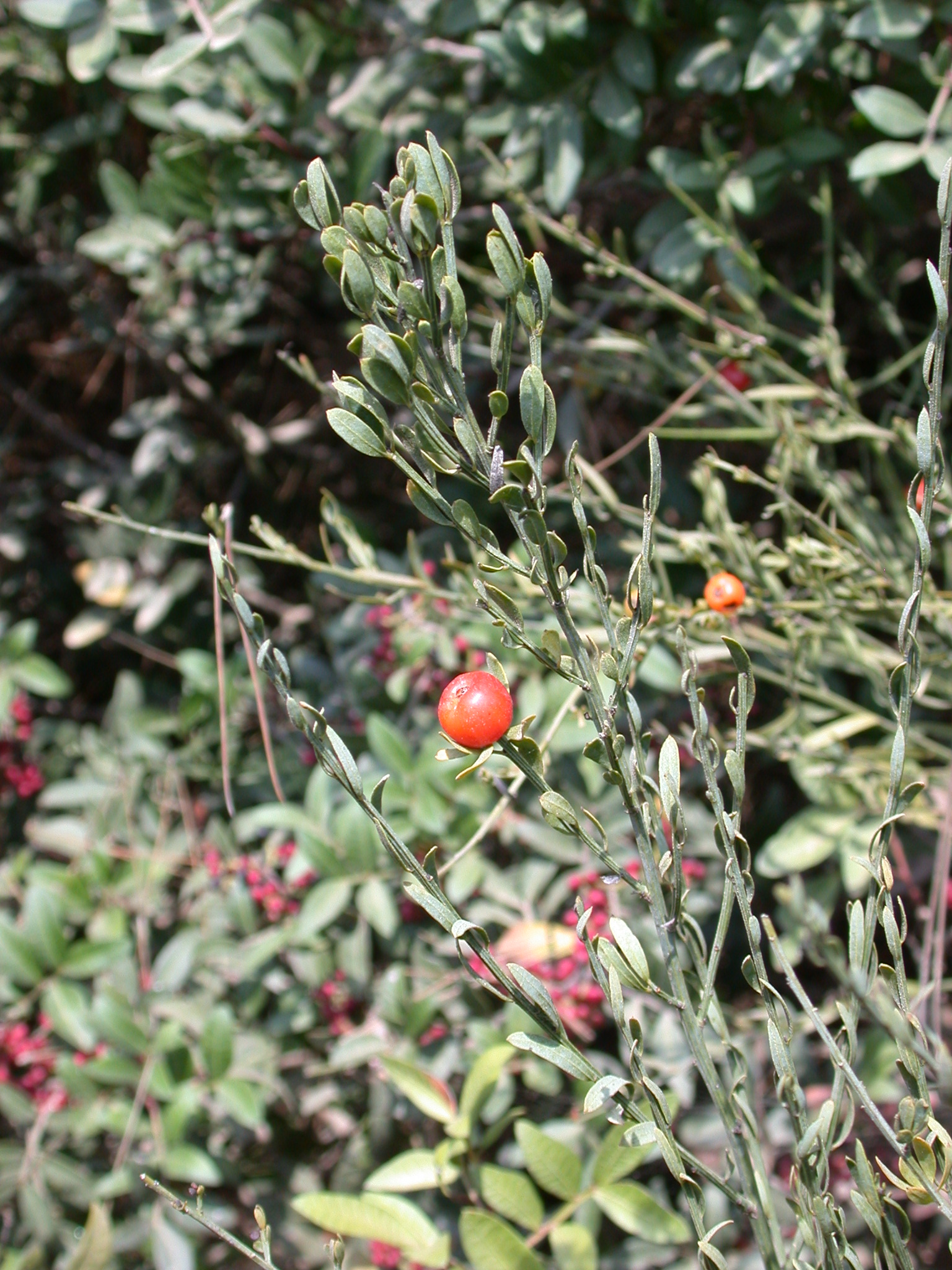
O. alba with fruits

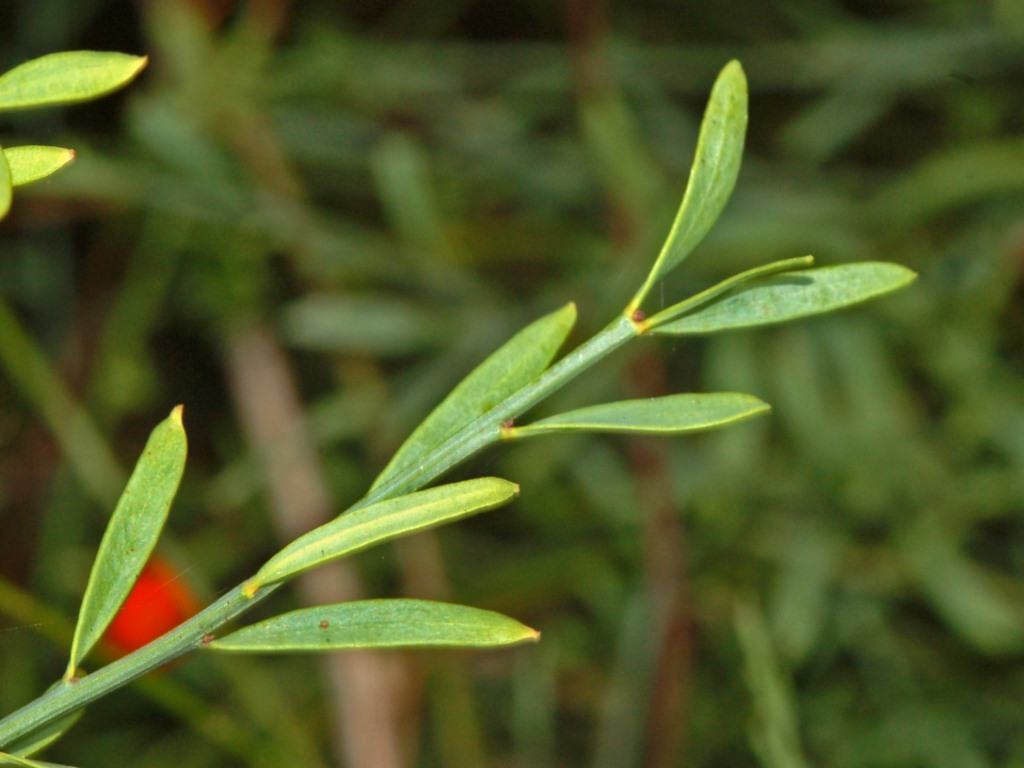
Leaves

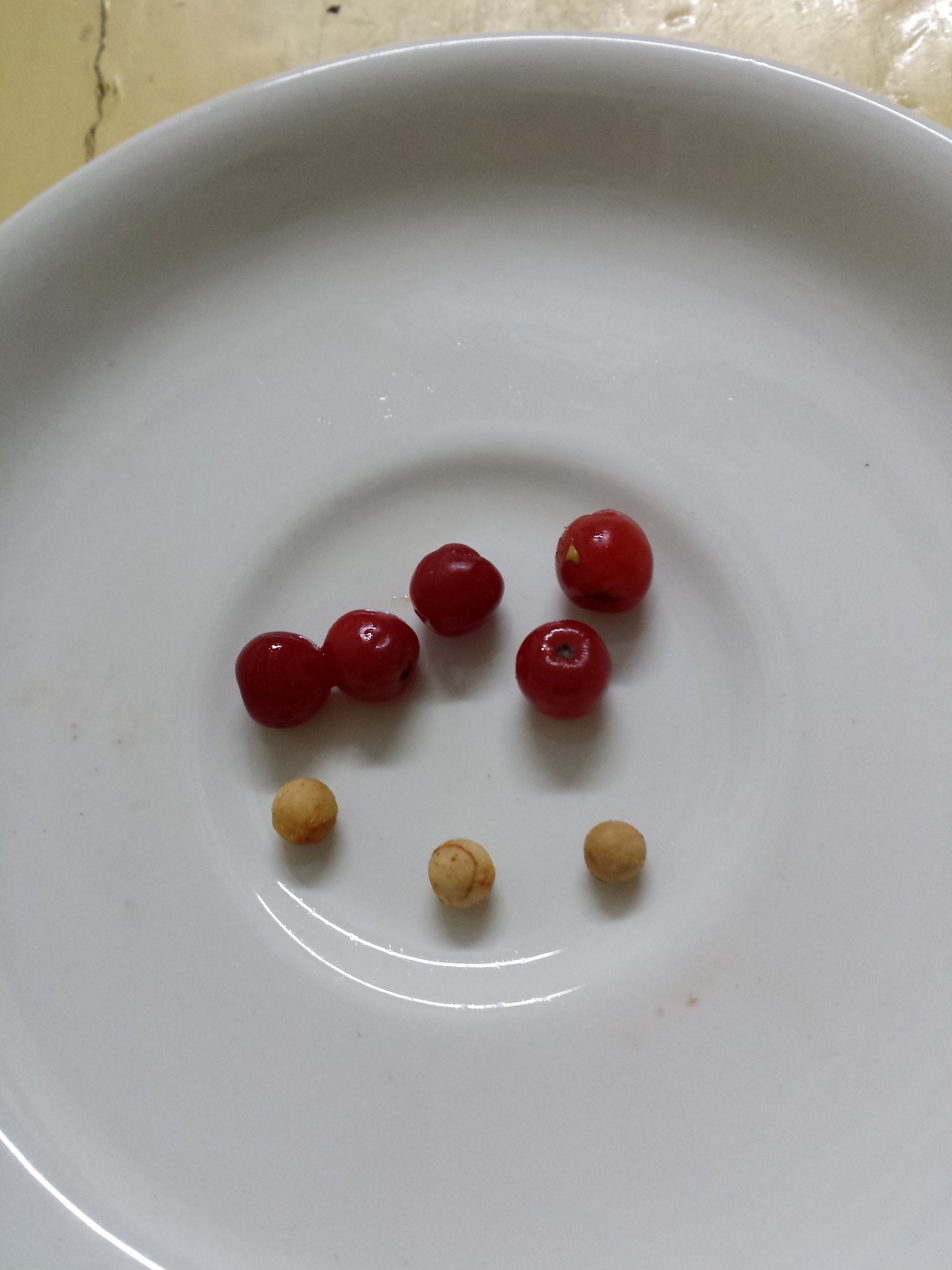
Fruits and seeds
