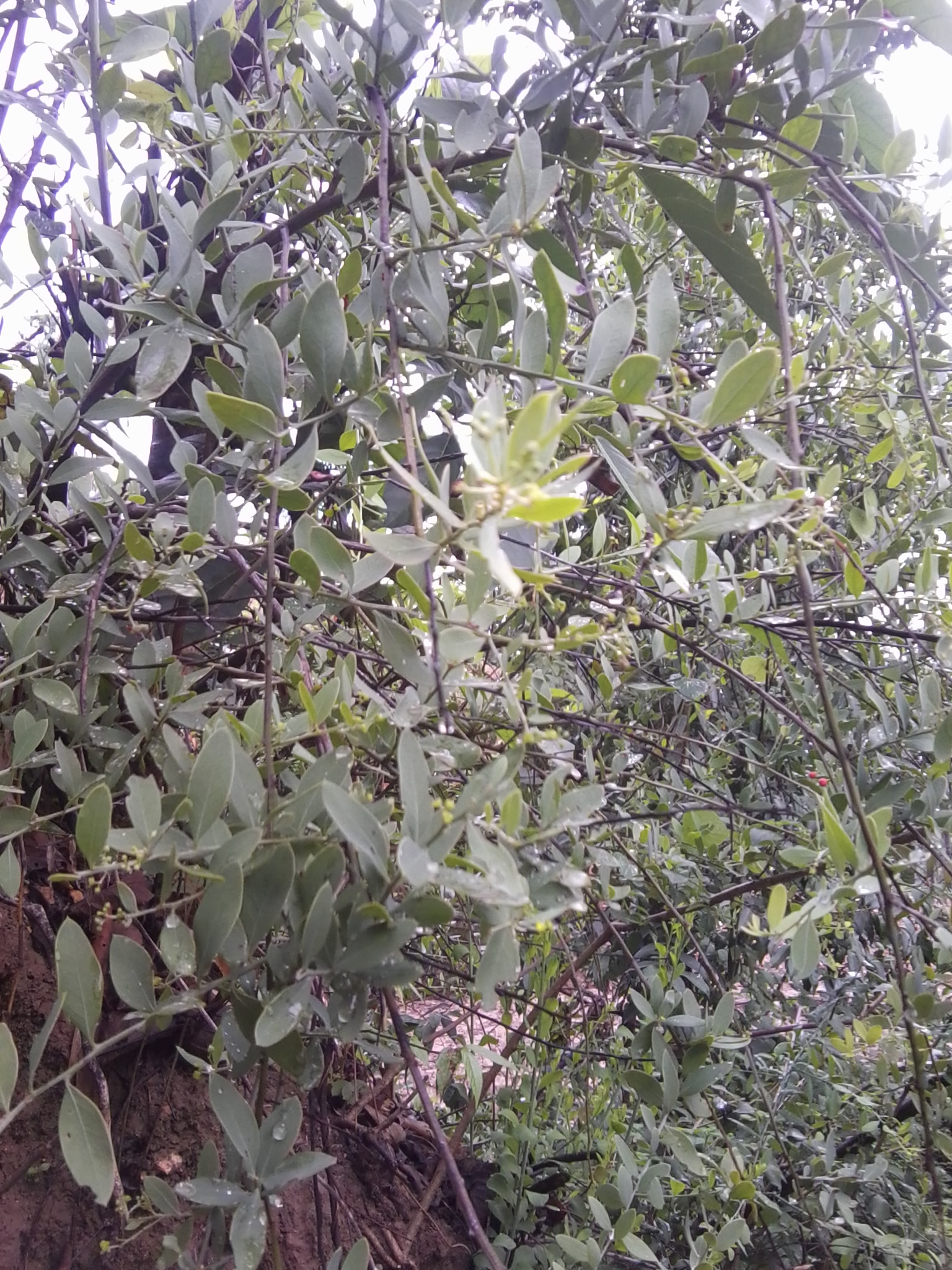

Scientific classification
- Kingdom: Plantae
- Clade: Embryophytes
- Clade: Tracheophytes
- Clade: Angiosperms
- Clade: Eudicots
- Order: Santalales
- Family: Santalaceae
- Genus: Osyris
- Species: O. quadripartita

Binomial name
- Osyris quadripartita Salzm. ex Decne.

= Osyris quadripartita =

Species of flowering plant in the mistletoe family

Osyris quadripartita, commonly known as wild tea plant, is a hemiparasitic plant found in Mediterranean habitats. It is a dioecious plant, with separate male and female flowers.
