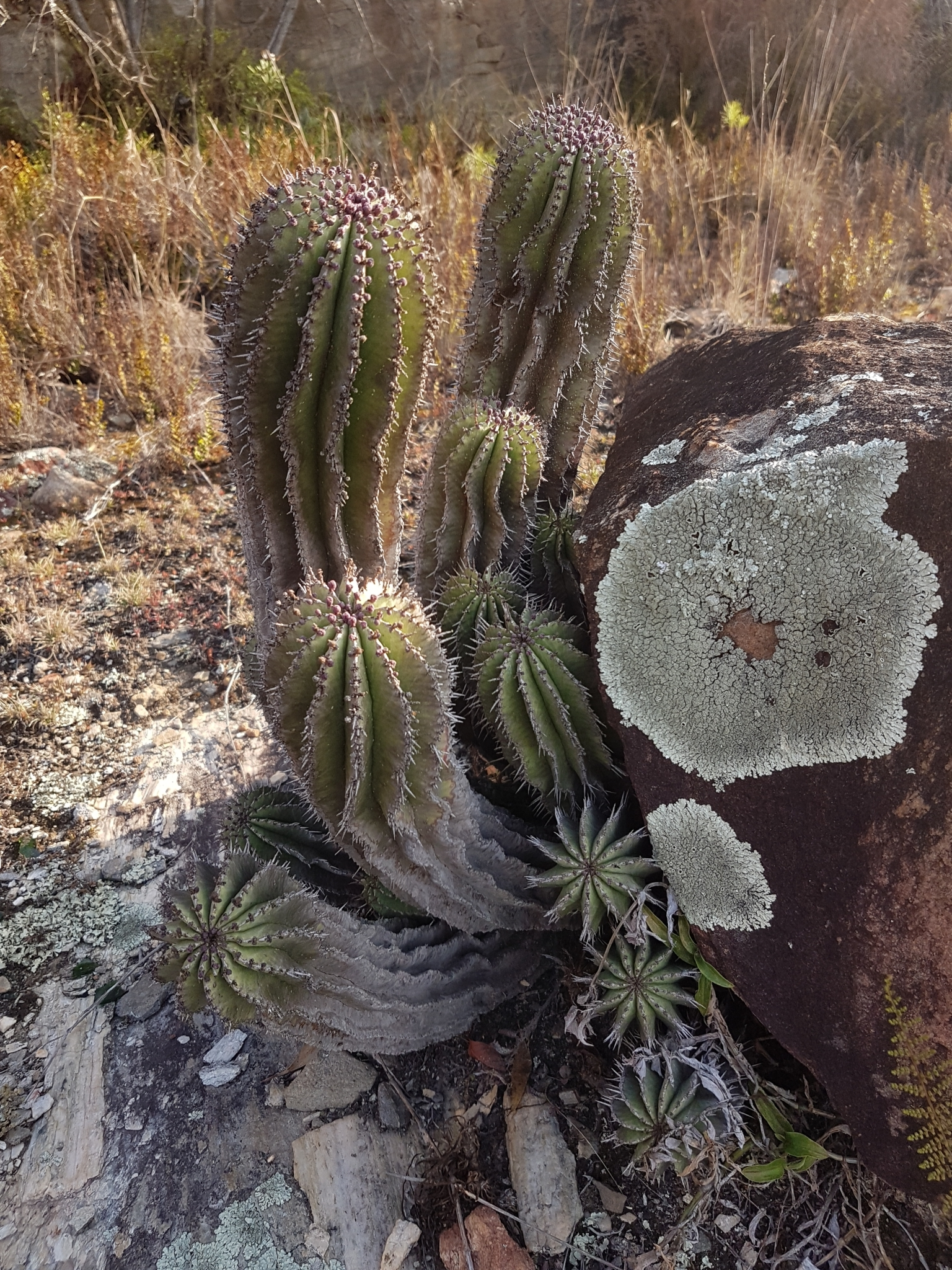
- Growing from beside a boulder, south of Makhanda, South Africa

Scientific classification
- Kingdom: Plantae
- Clade: Tracheophytes
- Clade: Angiosperms
- Clade: Eudicots
- Clade: Rosids
- Order: Malpighiales
- Family: Euphorbiaceae
- Genus: Euphorbia
- Species: E. polygona

Binomial name
- Euphorbia polygona Haw.

Synonyms
- Euphorbia anoplia; Euphorbia cucumerina; Euphorbia horrida; Euphorbia polygonata

= Euphorbia polygona =

Plant species in the spurge family

Euphorbia polygona, the many-angled cactus euphorbia, is a plant in the spurge family native to dry areas of South Africa.

== Description ==
Euphorbia polygona is a hairless succulent with many stems that can be 15 centimeters to 2 meters in length. The overall appearance is very similar to columnar cactuses from the Americas. Stems branch near the base of the plant, very rarely further up, and grow a fibrous root network from the base of the main stem or some of the branches. On occasion plants will produce short rhizomes, 2–10 cm long. The stems tend to be club-shaped, larger in diameter towards the top than at the base, with a width of 4–30 cm, though usually not more than 20 cm.

The stems are covered in tubercles, cone shaped outgrowths, they fuse to make seven to twenty ribs on the stems. They are often quite narrow and wavy. The groves between the ribs can be as much as 1.5 cm deep; they can go straight up the stems or less frequently twist around them. Towards the top of the stems small 1–2 mm long and 1 mm wide vestigial leaves are produced, but are not retained for long.

The thorns on the ribs are long lasting peduncles, the stalks that attach to the flowers, 0.4–4 cm long and 1–3 mm thick at the base. Some of these peduncles are modified to never produce flowers and on other plants they are absent. Usually the spines are in groups of two to five. The flowers are produced near the top of the stems, but not at its very end, in the joints between the tubercles atop the ribs.

== Taxonomy ==
Euphorbia polygona was given its scientific name in 1803 by Adrian Hardy Haworth. It is part of genus Euphorbia which is classified in the Euphorbiaceae family. According to Plants of the World Online it has no accepted varieties, but due to many botanists reducing Euphorbia horrida to a synonym of E. polygona the botanist Detlef H. Schnabel has argued for the recognition of a variety named horrida to prevent the loss of genetic diversity in the species.

If Euphorbia horrida is considered to be a synonym, then Euphorbia polygona has 18 heterotypic synonyms including 4 species and 14 varieties.

Table of Synonyms
| Name | Year | Rank | Notes |
|---|---|---|---|
| Euphorbia anoplia Stapf | 1923 | species | |
| Euphorbia cucumerina Willd. | 1799 | species | |
| Euphorbia horrida Boiss. | 1860 | species | |
| Euphorbia horrida var. major A.C.White, R.A.Dyer & B.Sloane | 1941 | variety | |
| Euphorbia horrida var. noorsveldensis A.C.White, R.A.Dyer & B.Sloane | 1941 | variety | |
| Euphorbia horrida var. striata A.C.White, R.A.Dyer & B.Sloane | 1941 | variety | |
| Euphorbia polygona var. alba D.H.Schnabel | 2014 | variety | |
| Euphorbia polygona var. ambigua D.H.Schnabel | 2014 | variety | |
| Euphorbia polygona var. anoplia (Stapf) D.H.Schnabel | 2013 | variety | |
| Euphorbia polygona var. exilis D.H.Schnabel | 2012 | variety | |
| Euphorbia polygona var. hebdomadalis D.H.Schnabel | 2012 | variety | |
| Euphorbia polygona var. horrida (Boiss.) D.H.Schnabel | 2014 | variety | |
| Euphorbia polygona var. major (A.C.White, R.A.Dyer & B.Sloane) D.H.Schnabel | 2013 | variety | |
| Euphorbia polygona var. minor D.H.Schnabel | 2013 | variety | |
| Euphorbia polygona var. nivea D.H.Schnabel | 2011 | variety | |
| Euphorbia polygona var. noorsveldensis (A.C.White, R.A.Dyer & B.Sloane) D.H.Schnabel | 2013 | variety | |
| Euphorbia polygona var. striata (A.C.White, R.A.Dyer & B.Sloane) D.H.Schnabel | 2013 | variety | |
| Euphorbia polygonata G.Lodd. | 1828 | species | nom. subnud. |

=== Names ===
Euphorbia polygona is known by the common name many-angled cactus euphorbia. The name African milk barrel, a name previously used for E. horrida, is now applied to the species by writers who accept the merger of the two taxa. It has also been called baboon's noors, from an Afrikaans name for the plant, baviaansnoors.

== Range and habitat ==
Euphorbia polygona is endemic to the country of South Africa where it is found in the Western and Eastern Cape provinces. There is grows from areas near Uniondale in the eastern part of the Western Cape in the Kouga, Baviaanskloof, Groot Winterhoek, and Suurberg mountains to the area near Makhanda in the Eastern Cape.

In the Cape Fold Belt it often is found on drier, rocky sandstone outcrops in relatively wet areas, often on the hotter north or east facing slopes. To the north on the edge of the Great Karoo it grows in flatter areas and hills, often on shale.

== Ecology ==
The cactus euphorbias, regardless of if E. horrida and E. polygona, have long been recognized as the only natural host for the mistletoe Viscum minimum. It grows within the stems of the plants pushing out small leaves and flowering shoots. In cultivation the related Euphorbia stellispina has been found to be a suitable host for the parasite. Plants shorter than 15 cm are considerably weakened by the parasite causing some tissue death and possibly killing the host.

== Cultivation ==
Many-angled cactus euphorbia has a long history of cultivation outside its native habitat, with the first records of it being grown in Europe dating from 1790. They are also grown in Karoo gardens and containers in their native South Africa.

Succulent euphorbias are readily propagated in cultivation from cuttings that are allowed to heal for 14 days before being planted into moist sand to root. Plants are also grown from seed planted in well drained soil with germination occurring after three to four weeks in warm conditions.

The plant is mildly poisonous to humans. The milky sap can cause mild to severe skin irritation and itching or permanent damage to the eyes.

The cultivar 'Snowflake' is valued by plant growers for the exceptionally generous coating of natural waxes giving its cactus-like stems a whitened appearance. It entered the plant trade in the 1980s and was variously labeled as E. horrida and E. polygona prior to their merger.
