= Oncocalyx =

Scientific classification
- Kingdom: Plantae
- Clade: Tracheophytes
- Clade: Angiosperms
- Clade: Eudicots
- Order: Santalales
- Family: Loranthaceae
- Genus: Oncocalyx; Tiegh.

Genus of plants

Oncocalyx is a genus of flowering plants belonging to the family Loranthaceae.

Its native range is Ethiopia to Southern Africa, and the Arabian Peninsula.

== Species ==
Species:

- Oncocalyx angularis M.G.Gilbert
- Oncocalyx bolusii (Sprague) Wiens & Polhill
- Oncocalyx cordifolius Wiens & Polhill
- Oncocalyx doberae (Schweinf.) A.G.Mill. & J.Nyberg
- Oncocalyx fischeri (Engl.) M.G.Gilbert
- Oncocalyx ghikae (Volkens & Schweinf.) M.G.Gilbert
- Oncocalyx glabratus (Engl.) M.G.Gilbert
- Oncocalyx kelleri (Engl.) M.G.Gilbert
- Oncocalyx quinquenervis (Hochst.) Wiens & Polhill
- Oncocalyx sulfureus (Engl.) Wiens & Polhill
- Oncocalyx ugogensis (Engl.) Wiens & Polhill
- Oncocalyx welwitschii (Engl.) Polhill & Wiens
