= Tapinanthus quequensis =

Scientific classification
- Kingdom: Plantae
- Clade: Tracheophytes
- Clade: Angiosperms
- Clade: Eudicots
- Order: Santalales
- Family: Loranthaceae
- Genus: Tapinanthus
- Species: T. quequensis

Binomial name
- Tapinanthus quequensis (Weim.) Polhill & Wiens

Synonyms
- Loranthus quequensis Weim.; Loranthus oleifolius var. leendertziae Sprague; Tapinanthus leendertziae (Sprague) Wiens

Species of flowering plant

Tapinanthus quequensis is a species of flowering plant in the family Loranthaceae. It is a hemiparasitic epiphyte native to Southern Africa, ranging from the southern Democratic Republic of the Congo through Angola, Zambia, and Zimbabwe to the Northern Provinces and northern Free State in South Africa.
