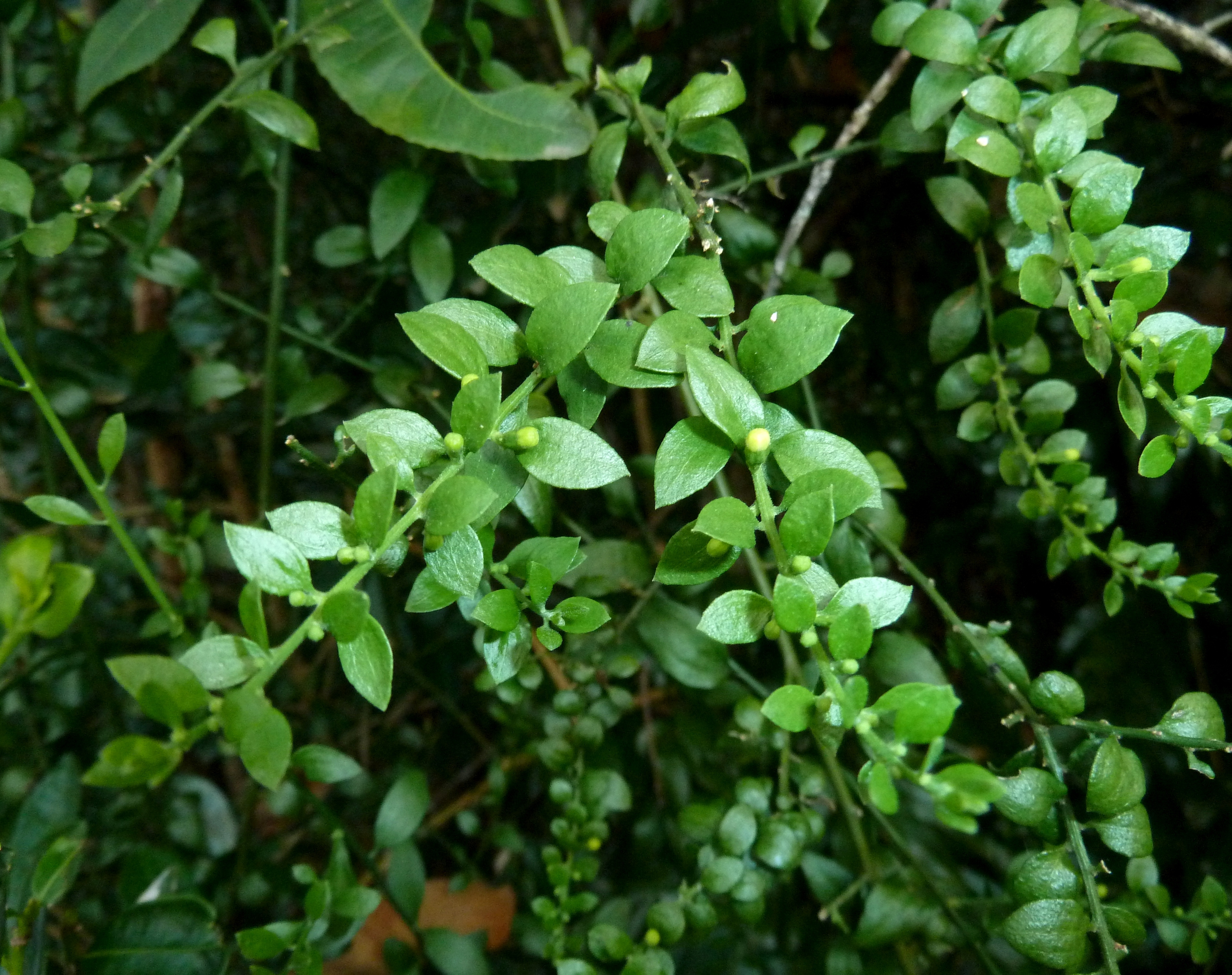
- Osyridicarpos schimperianus

Scientific classification
- Kingdom: Plantae
- Clade: Tracheophytes
- Clade: Angiosperms
- Clade: Eudicots
- Order: Santalales
- Family: Santalaceae
- Genus: Osyridicarpos; A.DC.
- Species: O. schimperianus

Binomial name
- Osyridicarpos schimperianus (Hochst. ex A.Rich.) A.DC.

= Osyridicarpos =

Genus of plants

Osyridicarpos is a monotypic genus of flowering plants belonging to the family Santalaceae. The only species is Osyridicarpos schimperianus.

Its native range is Eritrea to Southern Africa.
