= Lacomucinaea =

Scientific classification
- Kingdom: Plantae
- Clade: Tracheophytes
- Clade: Angiosperms
- Clade: Eudicots
- Order: Santalales
- Family: Santalaceae
- Genus: Lacomucinaea; Nickrent & M.A.García
- Species: L. lineata

Binomial name
- Lacomucinaea lineata (L.f.) Nickrent & M.A.García

Genus of plants

Lacomucinaea is a monotypic genus of flowering plants belonging to the family Santalaceae. The only species is Lacomucinaea lineata.

Its native range is Southern Africa.
