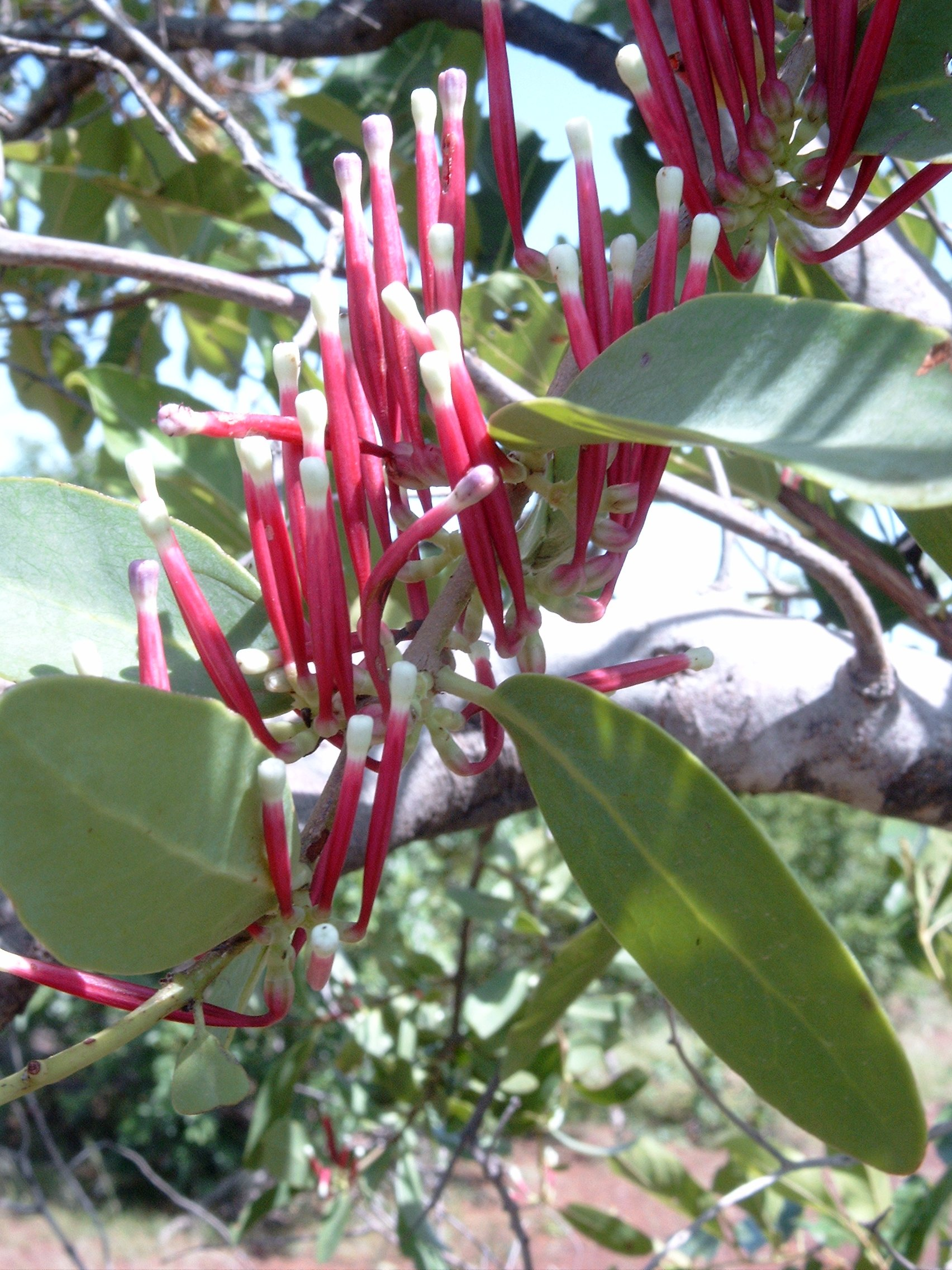
- Tapinanthus globiferus

Scientific classification
- Kingdom: Plantae
- Clade: Tracheophytes
- Clade: Angiosperms
- Clade: Eudicots
- Order: Santalales
- Family: Loranthaceae
- Genus: Tapinanthus (Blume) Rchb.

Synonyms
- Acrostephanus Tiegh.

= Tapinanthus =

Genus of mistletoes

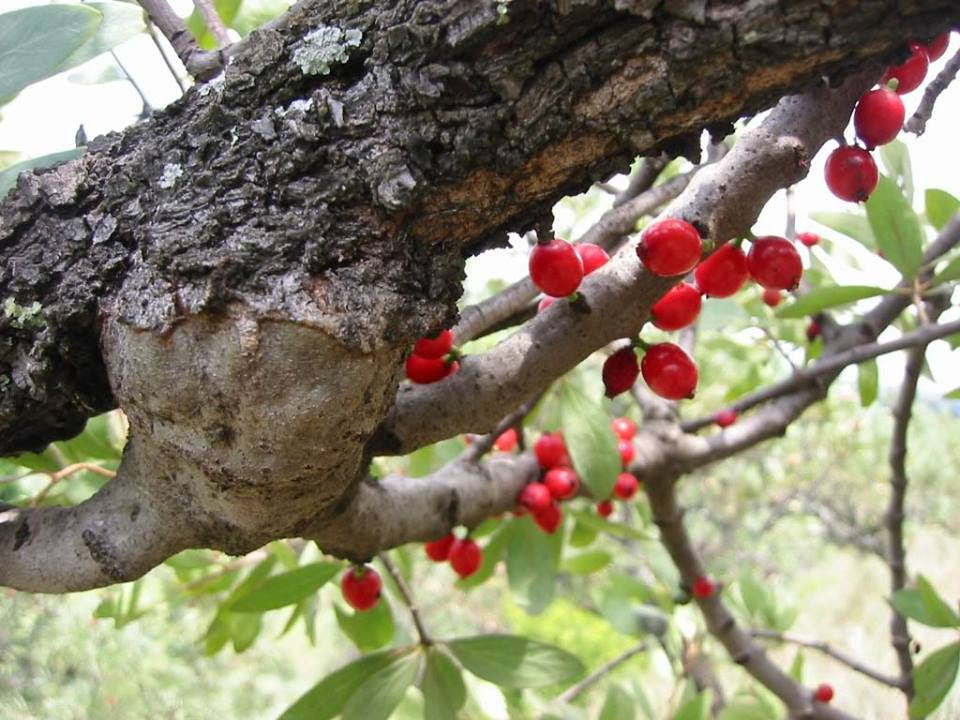
Haustorium and fruit of Tapinanthus oleifolius

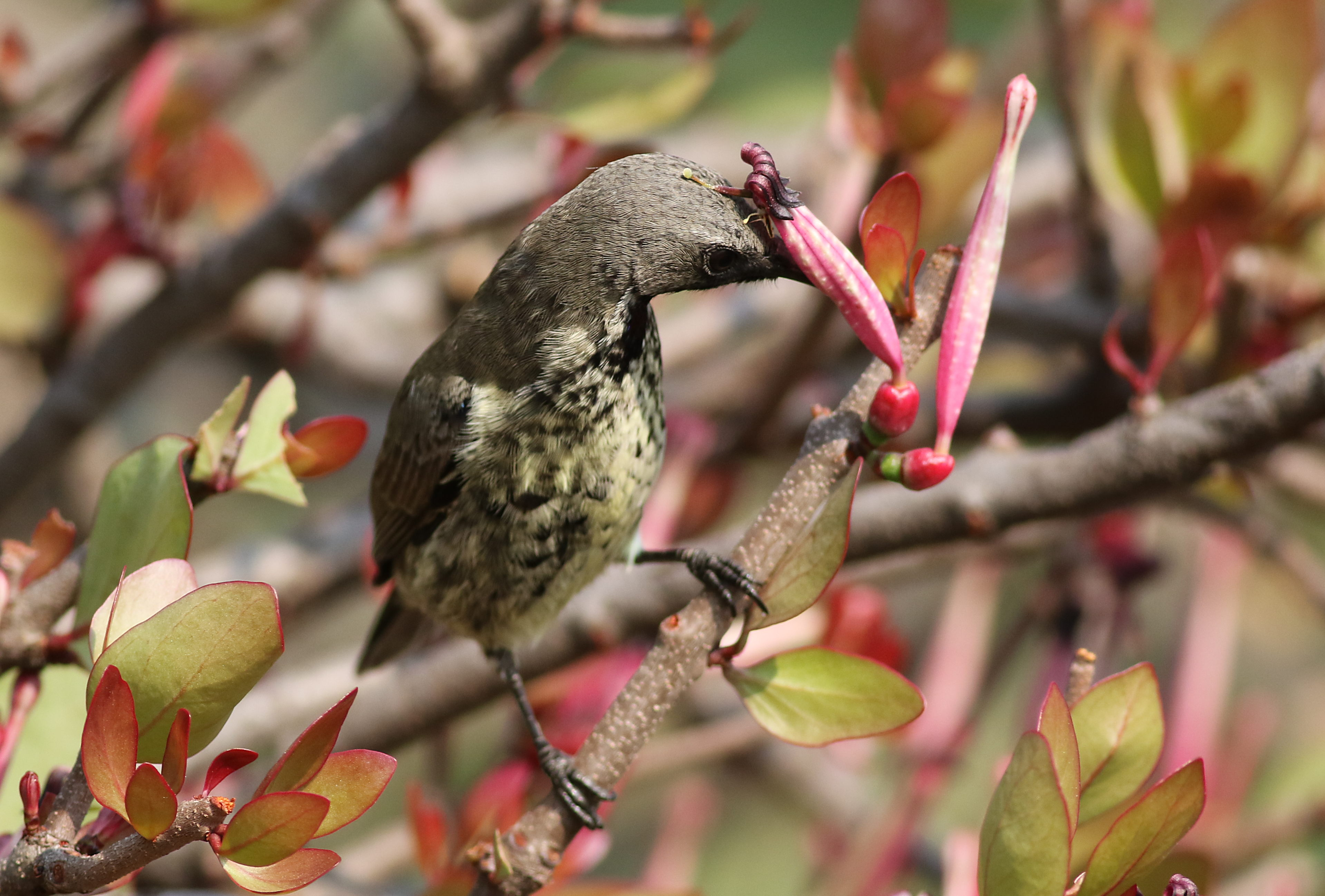
Ornithophily in T. rubromarginatus

Tapinanthus is a genus of mistletoe in the family Loranthaceae, native to Africa. The name of the genus is derived from the Greek tapeinos meaning "low" or "humble" and anthos meaning flower.

== Species ==
It may contain some 40 species, with 30 being accepted:

- Tapinanthus apodanthus (Sprague) Danser
- Tapinanthus bangwensis (Engl. & K.Krause) Danser
- Tapinanthus belvisii (DC.) Danser
- Tapinanthus buchneri (Engl.) Danser
- Tapinanthus buntingii (Sprague) Danser
- Tapinanthus buvumae (Rendle) Danser
- Tapinanthus constrictiflorus (Engl.) Danser
- Tapinanthus cordifolius Polhill & Wiens
- Tapinanthus coronatus (Tiegh.) Danser
- Tapinanthus dependens (Engl.) Danser
- Tapinanthus erectotruncatus Balle ex Polhill & Wiens
- Tapinanthus erianthus (Sprague) Danser
- Tapinanthus farmari (Sprague) Danser
- Tapinanthus forbesii (Sprague) Wiens
- Tapinanthus glaucophyllus (Engl.) Danser
- Tapinanthus globiferus (A.Rich.) Tiegh.
- Tapinanthus letouzeyi (Balle) Polhill & Wiens
- Tapinanthus longiflorus Polhill & Wiens
- Tapinanthus malacophyllus (Engl. & K.Krause) Danser
- Tapinanthus mechowii (Engl.) Tiegh.
- Tapinanthus mollissimus (Engl.) Danser
- Tapinanthus ogowensis (Engl.) Danser
- Tapinanthus oleifolius (J.C.Wendl.) Danser
- Tapinanthus ophiodes (Sprague) Danser
- Tapinanthus pentagonia (DC.) Tiegh.
- Tapinanthus praetexta Polhill & Wiens
- Tapinanthus preussii (Engl.) Tiegh.
- Tapinanthus quequensis (Weim.) Polhill & Wiens
- Tapinanthus rubromarginatus (Engl.) Danser
- Tapinanthus sessilifolius (P.Beauv.) Blume
