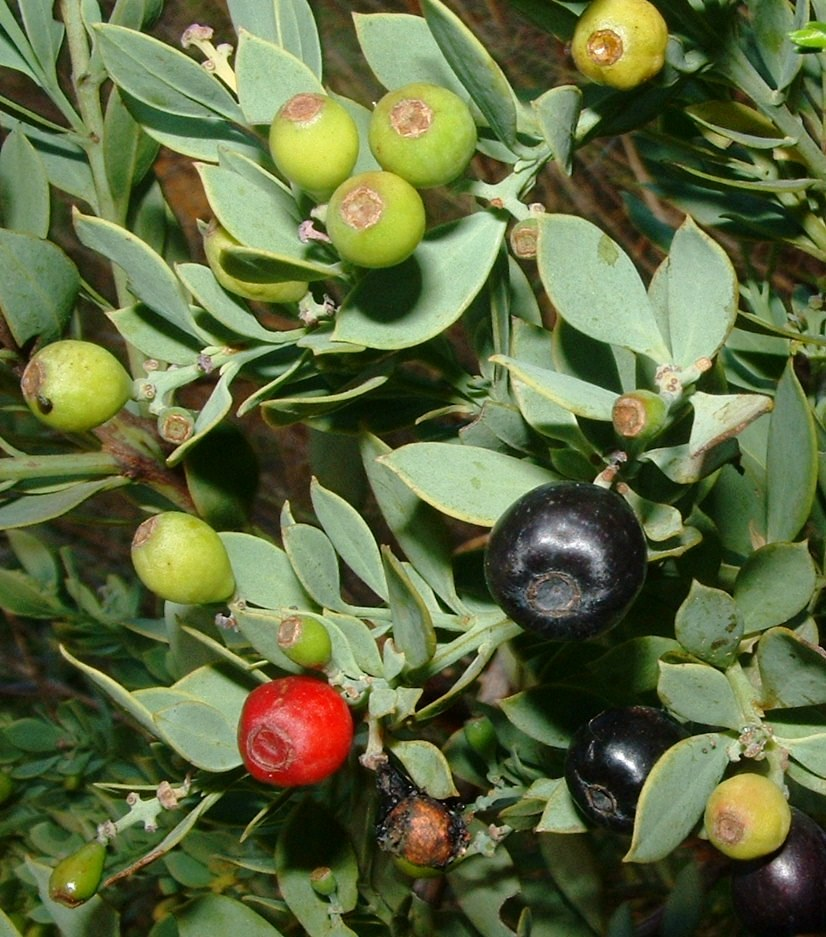

Scientific classification
- Kingdom: Plantae
- Clade: Embryophytes
- Clade: Tracheophytes
- Clade: Angiosperms
- Clade: Eudicots
- Order: Santalales
- Family: Santalaceae
- Genus: Osyris
- Species: O. compressa

Binomial name
- Osyris compressa (P.J.Bergius) A.DC

= Osyris compressa =

Species of flowering plant

Osyris compressa (Cape sumach or pruimbos) is a facultatively hemiparasitic, mainly South African plant of the sandalwood family, Santalaceae. Until recently, the favoured binomial name was Colpoon compressum, but around 2001, the genus Colpoon was included in Osyris on the basis of comparative DNA studies. That assignment is not final, however, and according to the Kew Gardens plant list, Colpoon compressum P.J.Bergius, though still in review, is the accepted name.

== Distribution and description ==
Cape sumach is a shrub or small tree of up to 5 m (16 ft) tall, though a more typical size for a plant growing in the open would be 2 to 3 m (6.6 to 9.8 ft). The leaves are opposite, decussate, blue-green with a greyish bloom, elliptical, smooth, stiff, typically about 20–50 mm (0.8–2.0 in) long, with thickened, entire margins. The inflorescence is a terminal panicle, bearing small, slightly fragrant, bisexual flowers. The flowers are creamy-green and unspectacular, but they appear through much of the year, attracting pollinating insects of various types. The ovary has four ovules, but the fruit is a single-seeded drupe, a prolate spheroid in shape. It is about 15 to 25 mm long and perhaps 10 to 15 mm across. The drupe is fleshy with a smooth skin crowned with the perianth lobes in a ring around its tip. Usually by the time the fruit is ripe, a circular groove is all that remains of the perianth. The fruit are colourful, progressing first from greenish blue to bright red, and then to glossy purple or black as they ripen; they mature at different rates, so the successive colours can be quite showy in combination.

The species is mainly South African, occurring from the coastal fynbos in the region of the Cape Peninsula in the west, along the south coast and north into tropical East Africa.

== Reproduction and ecology ==
O. compressa is a tough and adaptable plant. It can withstand frost, heat and winds. It grows fast and survives in poor, sandy soils, even in coastal dunes, where it may play a significant role as a windbreak and in binding sand. Being monoecious, and with bisexual flowers, and both cross-pollinating and self-fertile, the species produces fertile seeds prolifically. It begins to bear fruit when quite young, and it seeds plentifully practically throughout the year. The fruit attracts a range of birds and mammals that spread the seed effectively.

Like many members of the family Santalaceae, it exploits a facultative hemiparasitic ecological strategy to supplement its nutrient supplies, especially in dry conditions or poor soils. Its roots form haustoria that tap into the roots of nearby plants and extract their sap. Although these plants can grow without a host, this habit helps them to flourish in relatively poor coastal sands, and they need hosts if they are to grow at their best. In this respect, O. compressa resembles some other hemiparasites in related families such as Nuytsia floribunda in the Loranthaceae.

Being parasitic does not protect O. compressa from other parasites; several species of mistletoe in the genus Viscum (currently recognised as members of the same family as Osyris) often parasitise its branches. Also, given it is a root parasite, it in turn may be host to another root parasite in the same family, Thesidium fragile, and possibly related species. It is not clear which, if either, of these rival root parasites benefits from the other when their roots meet.

Being a densely leaved shrub with plentiful, if inconspicuous, flowers and edible fruit, O. compressa is of importance as a shelter and food plant for many animals. Of these probably the best-known is the butterfly Mylothris agathina, a member of the family Pieridae.

== Cultivation ==
This plant is popular in coastal gardens as an ornamental. It grows in coastal dunes and because of its vigorous and compact growth habit, it can be shaped into a dense hedge. It also produces attractive multicoloured berries throughout the year that are ornamental and attract frugivorous birds. Osyris compressa has been grown in programs to stabilize coastal dunes.

The leaves and bark used to be valued for tanning. The wood is high-quality and fine-grained, but the plant seldom produces trunks or limbs large enough for most uses. Although not much active cultivation of the plant occurs, it seems to be of interest as a source of incense and essential oil in much the same way as sandalwood.

The flesh of the berries is edible and formed part of the diet of the local Khoikhoi, both fresh and preserved as the dried pulp. It shows little promise as a popular fruit for westerners, however, having a "tingly sour taste", according to some reports. Others however describe it as "plum-like", and the Afrikaans name pruimbos means "plum bush". An extract from the boiled bark has been used to flavour tea.

Osyris compressa can be propagated by seed.
