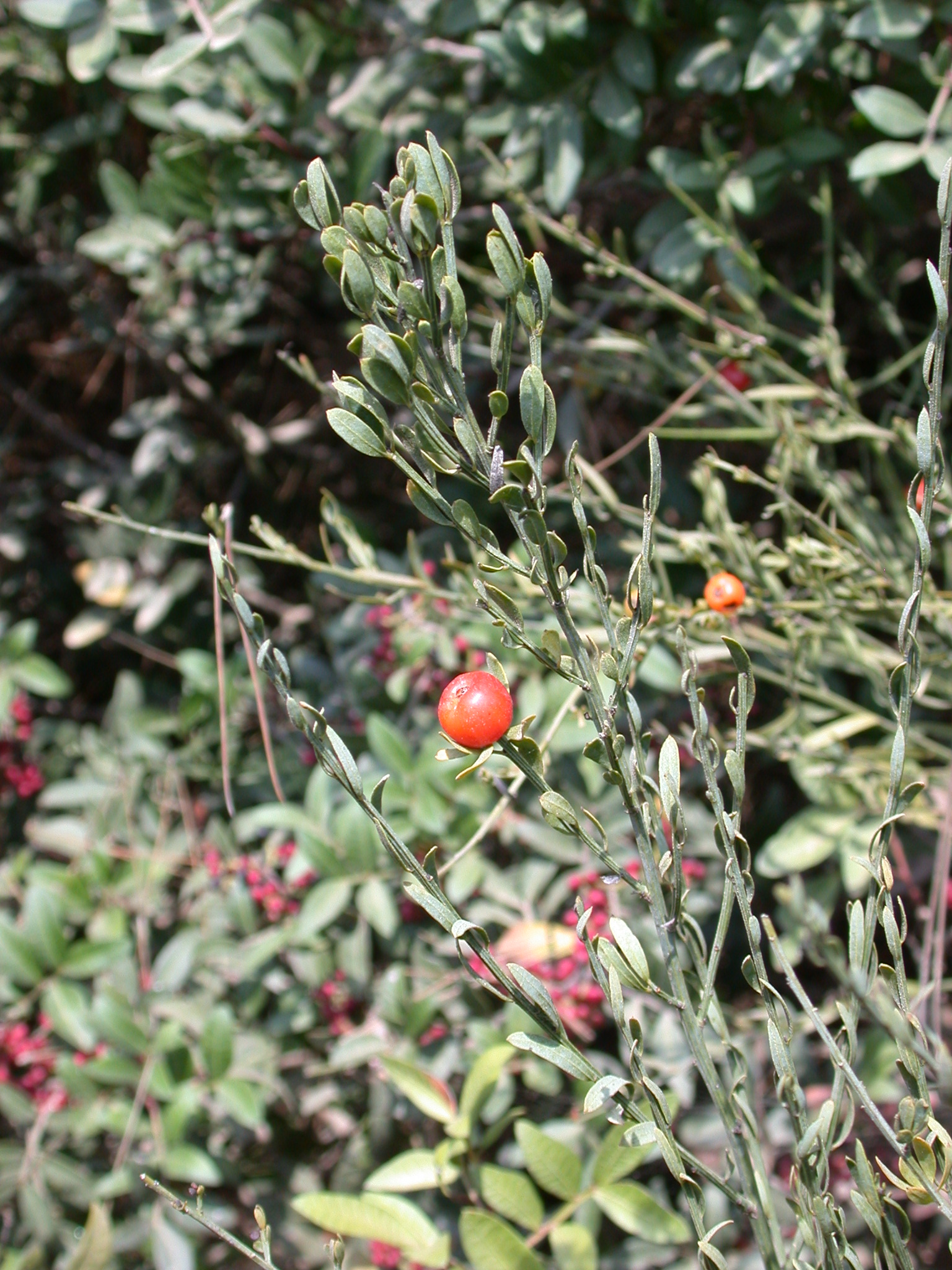
- Osiris alba

Scientific classification
- Kingdom: Plantae
- Clade: Embryophytes
- Clade: Tracheophytes
- Clade: Angiosperms
- Clade: Eudicots
- Order: Santalales
- Family: Santalaceae
- Genus: Osyris; L.

Synonyms
- Casia Duhamel; Colpoon P.J.Bergius; Fusanus L.

= Osyris =

Genus of flowering plants

Osyris is a genus of plants in the family Santalaceae, one of the many genera known as sandalwoods, but not one of the true sandalwood. The species of this genus are mostly hemiparasitic, meaning although they can survive and grow by themselves, they also opportunistically tap into the root systems of nearby plants and parasitize them.

Five species are accepted.

- Osyris alba L. – common name osyris
- Osyris daruma Parsa
- Osyris compressa (P.J.Bergius) A.DC. – Cape sumach or pruimbos
- Osyris lanceolata Hochst. & Steud. (synonym Osyris quadripartita Salzm. ex Decne.) – African sandalwood, wild tea plant
- Osyris speciosa (A.W.Hill) J.C.Manning & Goldblatt
