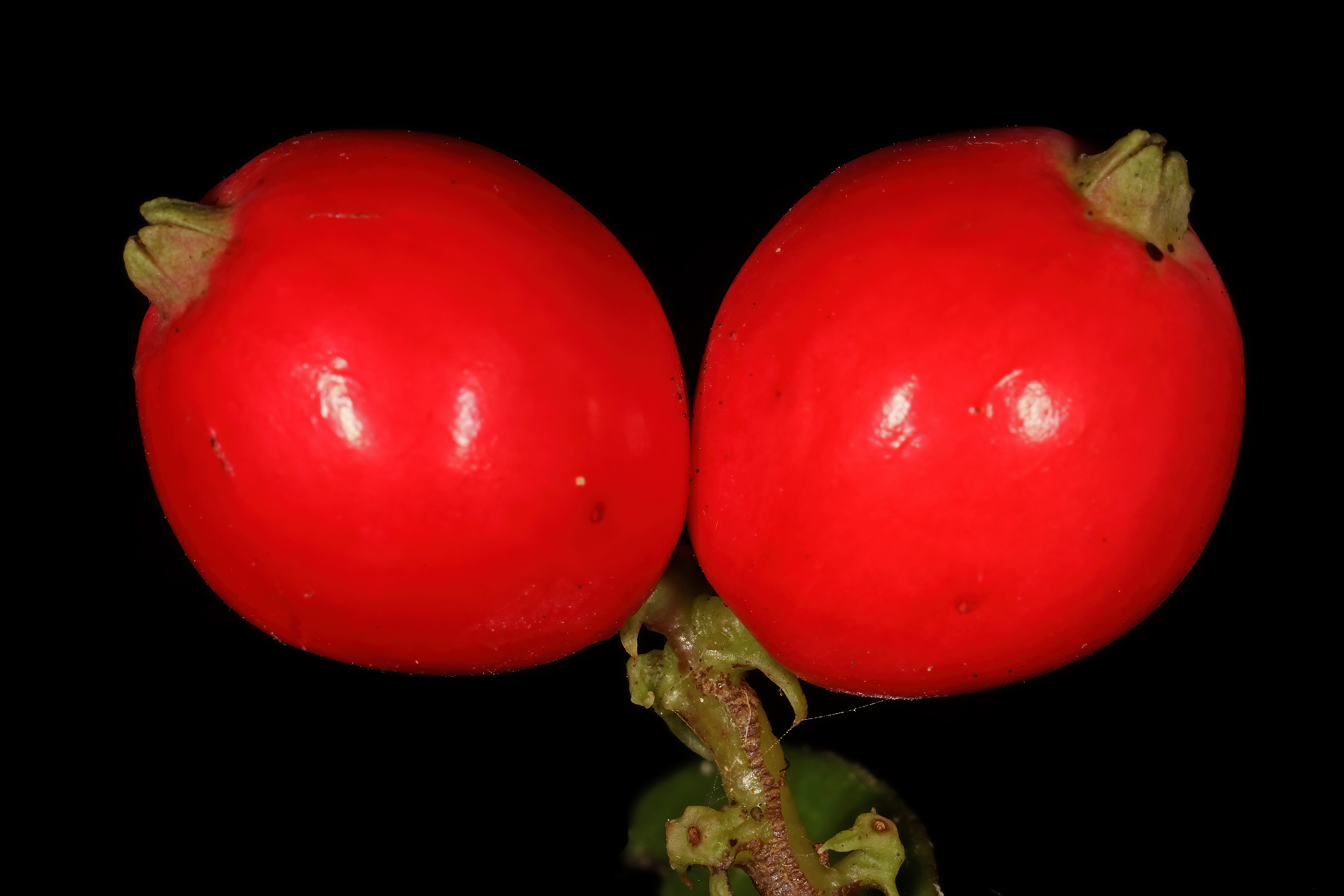

Scientific classification
- Kingdom: Plantae
- Clade: Tracheophytes
- Clade: Angiosperms
- Clade: Eudicots
- Order: Santalales
- Family: Santalaceae
- Genus: Rhoiacarpos; A.DC.
- Species: R. capensis

Binomial name
- Rhoiacarpos capensis (Harv.) A.DC.

Synonyms
- Colpoon capense (Harv.) Sim; Hamiltonia capensis Harv.; Santalum capense Spreng. ex A.DC., not validly publ.

= Rhoiacarpos =

Genus of plants

Rhoiacarpos is a genus of flowering plants belonging to the family Santalaceae. It contains a single species, Rhoiacarpos capensis, a subshrub or shrub native to the Cape Provinces and KwaZulu-Natal in South Africa.
