= Thesium goetzeanum =

Scientific classification
- Kingdom: Plantae
- Clade: Tracheophytes
- Clade: Angiosperms
- Clade: Eudicots
- Order: Santalales
- Family: Santalaceae
- Genus: Thesium
- Species: T. goetzeanum

Binomial name
- Thesium goetzeanum Engl.

Synonyms
- Thesium caespitosum Robyns & Lawalrée; Thesium coriarium A.W. Hill (1915); Thesium cymosum auct.; Thesium deceptum N.E. Br. (1932); Thesium dissitum auct.; Thesium macrogyne A.W. Hill (1915); Thesium nigrum A.W. Hill (1915); Thesium orientale A.W. Hill (1915); Thesium rhodesiacum Pilg; Thesium rogersii A.W. Hill (1913); Thesium schweinfurthii var. laxum Engl.

African plant species

Thesium goetzeanum is a species of plant from Africa, where it grows between South Africa and Kenya.

== History ==
Species in the genus Thesium are poorly understood. This was particularly the case for the Thesium goetzeanum complex, which was assessed in 2018. It contained a number of morphologically similar and variable species in southern Africa. The number of species in this complex was reduced from sixteen to nine.

Thesium goetzeanum was found to have the highest number of synonyms. Five species were determined to be a synonym. These are T. coriarium A.W.Hill, T. deceptum N.E.Br, T. macrogyne A.W.Hill, T. nigrum A.W.Hill, and T. orientale A.W.Hill.

== Description ==
Plants start off herbacoues with virgate growth form (erect, rod-like stems) and become increasingly woody and often decumbent (branches grow along the ground but turn up towards the ends) with age. It has a rhizomatous rootstock. The leaves are linear or lance shaped and often have roughly hairy margins. Flowers are present between August and February. They are 3–4.5 mm (0.12–0.18 in) long and borne in racemose cymes. The bracts are mostly fused to the stalk. There is no fruit stipe.

=== Similar species ===
Thesium goetzeanum is commonly confused with Thesium resedoides as both have similar growth forms. Thesium goetzeanum, however, has sparser branches with parallel stem (grow at about 45° in T. resedoides), vegetative shoots that grow past the inflorescences, and larger flowers.

== Distribution and habitat ==
This species is found growing between South Africa and Kenya. It is found in Botswana, Burundi, Eswatini, Kenya, Lesotho, Malawi, Mozambique, Rwanda, South Africa, Tanzania, Zambia, and Zimbabwe. While it prefers the grassland biome, it has also been recorded from rocky savanna areas. It grows at elevations of 1,000–3,000 m (3,300–9,800 ft).

== Ecology ==
This species occurs in the highest density in areas that have recently burned.

== Etymology ==
This species is named after Walter Goetze, a German naturalist, explorer and photographer who collected botanical and zoological specimens in Tanzania.

== Conservation ==
As this species is abundant and widespread, it is classified as least concern.
