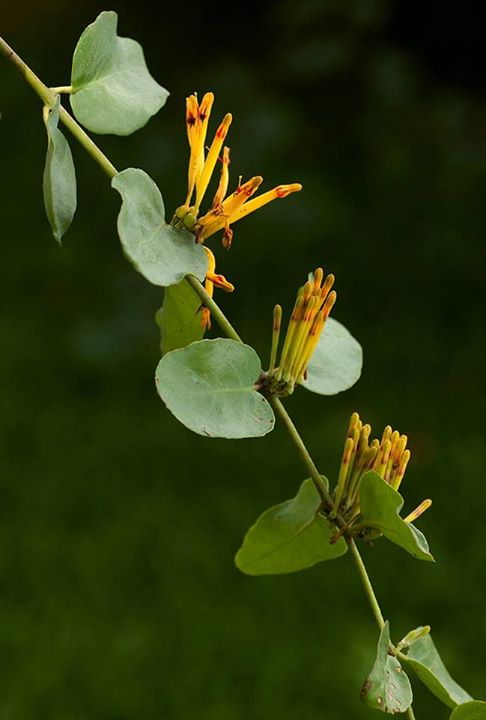
- Flowers and foliage, northern Zimbabwe

Scientific classification
- Kingdom: Plantae
- Clade: Tracheophytes
- Clade: Angiosperms
- Clade: Eudicots
- Order: Santalales
- Family: Loranthaceae
- Genus: Agelanthus
- Species: A. pungu

Binomial name
- Agelanthus pungu (De Wild.) Polhill & Wiens

Synonyms
- Loranthus pungu De Wild. Tapinanthus pungu (De Wild.) Danser; Loranthus blantyreanus Engl. Loranthus bulawayensis Engl. Loranthus carsonii Baker & Sprague; Loranthus ceciliae N.E.Br. Loranthus ceciliae var. buchananii Sprague; Loranthus giorgii Balle; Loranthus glaucescens Engl. & K.Krause; Loranthus luteiflorus Engl. & K.Krause; Loranthus pungu var. angustifolius De Wild. Tapinanthus blantyreanus (Engl.) Danser; Tapinanthus bulawayensis (Engl.) Danser; Tapinanthus carsonii (Baker & Sprague) Danser; Tapinanthus ceciliae (N.E.Br.) Danser; Tapinanthus glaucescens (Engl. & K.Krause) Danser; Tapinanthus luteiflorus (Engl. & K.Krause) Danser

= Agelanthus pungu =

Blue-leaved mistletoe

Species of mistletoe

The blue-leaved mistletoe (Agelanthus pungu) is a species of perennial, parasitic plant in the family Loranthaceae, which is native to the southeastern Afrotropics.

== Description ==
Its size is variable, as is the shape of its leaves. The glabrous and opposite leaves are grey-green to blue-green in colour. A fuller description is given at Govaerts et al. (2018)

== Range ==
A. pungu has been recorded in Tanzania, Zambia, Malawi, Zimbabwe, Mozambique, northeastern Namibia and northern South Africa. It is found from 150 to 2,100 meters in altitude.

== Habitat ==
It grows on a range of host plants in miombo woodland, Acacia-Commiphora bushland, wooded grassland, forest edges and in riparian growth.
