= Oncocalyx quinquenervius =

Scientific classification
- Kingdom: Plantae
- Clade: Tracheophytes
- Clade: Angiosperms
- Clade: Eudicots
- Order: Santalales
- Family: Loranthaceae
- Genus: Oncocalyx
- Species: O. quinquenervius

Binomial name
- Oncocalyx quinquenervius (Hochst.) Wiens & Polhill

Species of mistletoe

Oncocalyx quinquenervius (the banded matchflower) is a parasitic plant species in the family Loranthaceae, native to South Africa.

== Description ==
Oncocalyx quinquenervius is a hemiparasite.

The flowers are tubular, splitting down one side and have red to pink and white bands. Mainly flowering from June to September (in the southern hemisphere). The leaves are green, succulent and simple in shape, elliptic with margin entire. Usually 5 veined from the leaf base. It grows to a height of 50 cm to 100 cm. The fruit is a red berry about 10mm in diameter.

== Taxonomy ==
This species was previously placed in the genus Tieghemia.

== Distribution and habitat ==
Oncocalyx quinquenervius is endemic to the Eastern Cape and KwaZuluNatal in South Africa.

== Conservation ==
The plant is listed as Least Concern in the SANBI Redlist.
