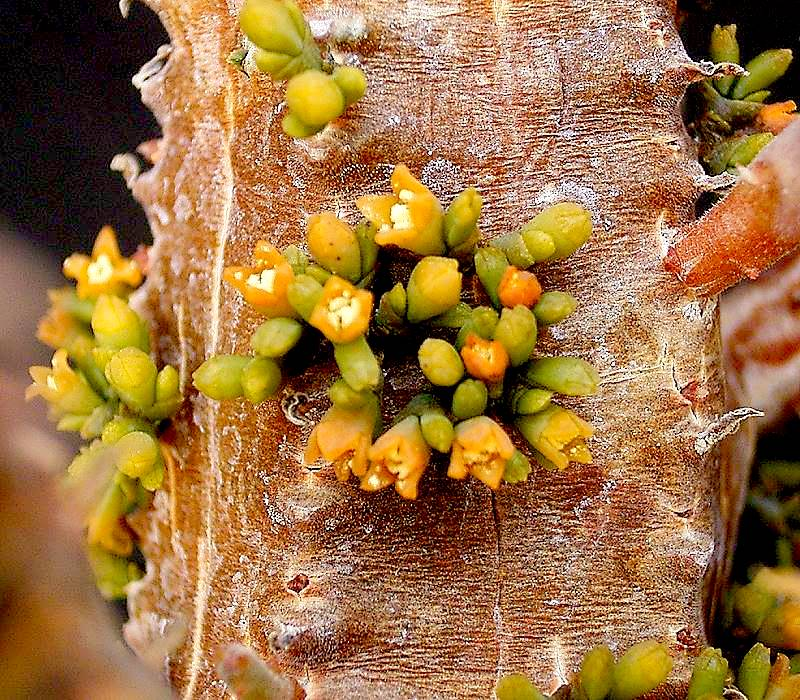
- Viscum minimum leaf scales and flowers emerging from the host plant.

Scientific classification
- Kingdom: Plantae
- Clade: Tracheophytes
- Clade: Angiosperms
- Clade: Eudicots
- Order: Santalales
- Family: Santalaceae
- Genus: Viscum
- Species: V. minimum

Binomial name
- Viscum minimum Harv.

Synonyms
- Aspidixia minima (Harv.) Tiegh.

= Viscum minimum =

Species of epiphyte

Viscum minimum is a species of mistletoe in the family Santalaceae. It is a parasitic plant native to South Africa.

== Description ==
In its native habitat Viscum minimum uses two species of succulents, Euphorbia polygona and Euphorbia horrida, as host plants. However, given the opportunity, the plant uses a range of succulents, including cacti, as hosts.

A mature Viscum minimum consists mostly of haustoria within the host plant, with small stems of less than one millimeter in length each with a single whorl of 2-3 scale-like leaves. A single flower, and later a red round fruit with a diameter of 8-9 millimeters, emerges from these stems. The leaves and stems are capable of photosynthesis, making the plant technically a hemiparasite.

The Viscum minimum mitochondrial genome has been sequenced, showing an unusual loss of genes or their functions.

=== Seed germination ===
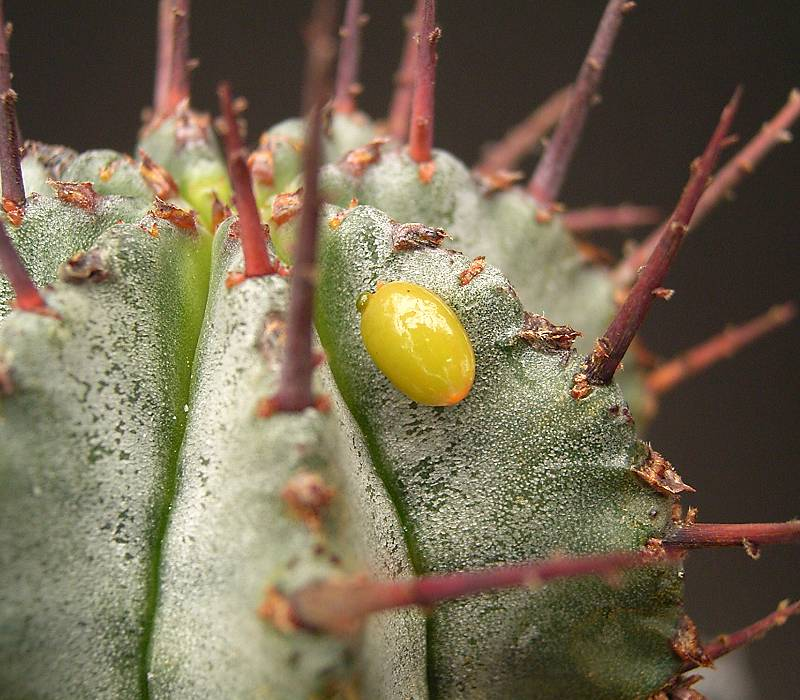
Day 1: The sticky seed has landed on the host plant.

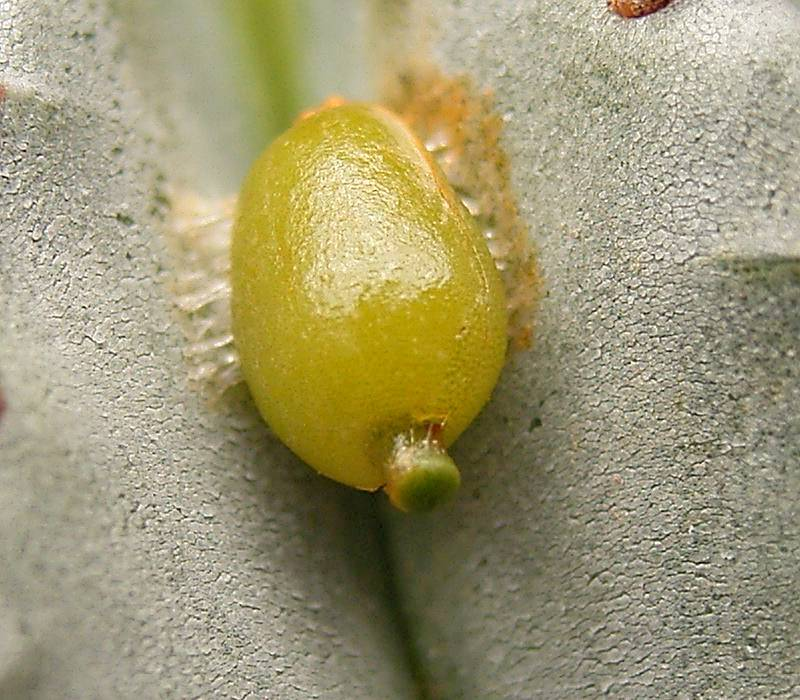
Day 4: Germination has commenced.

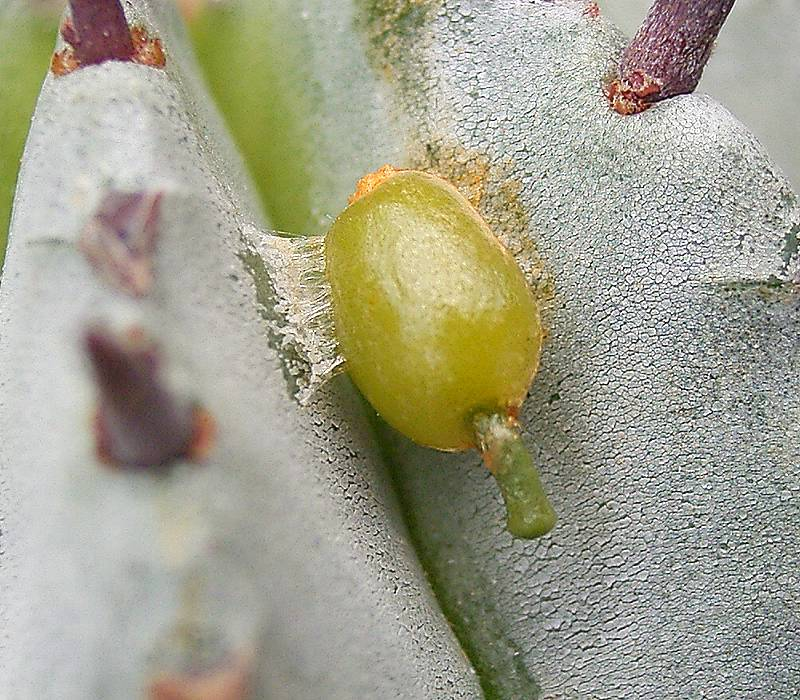
Day 10: The shoot emerges from the seed.

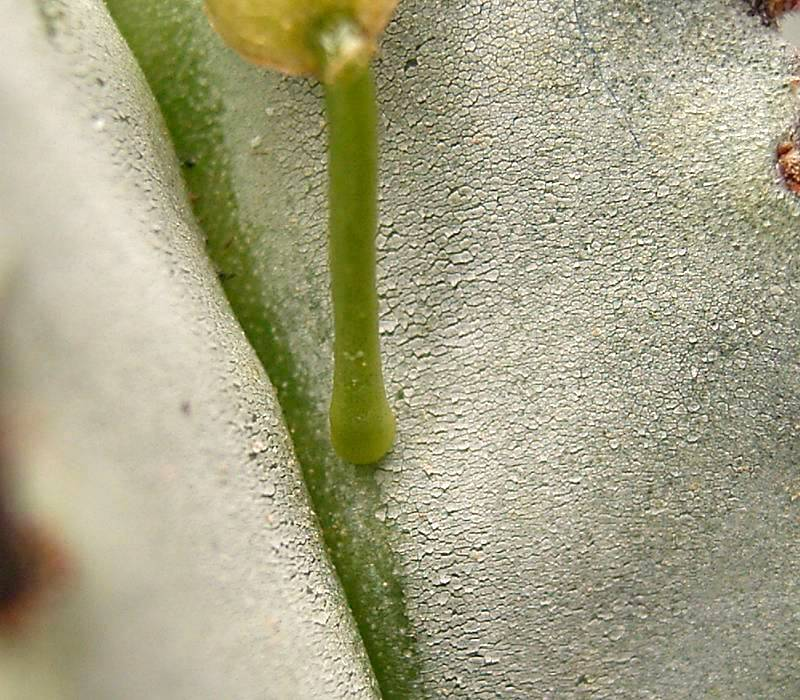
Day 23: The shoot has made contact with the host plant.

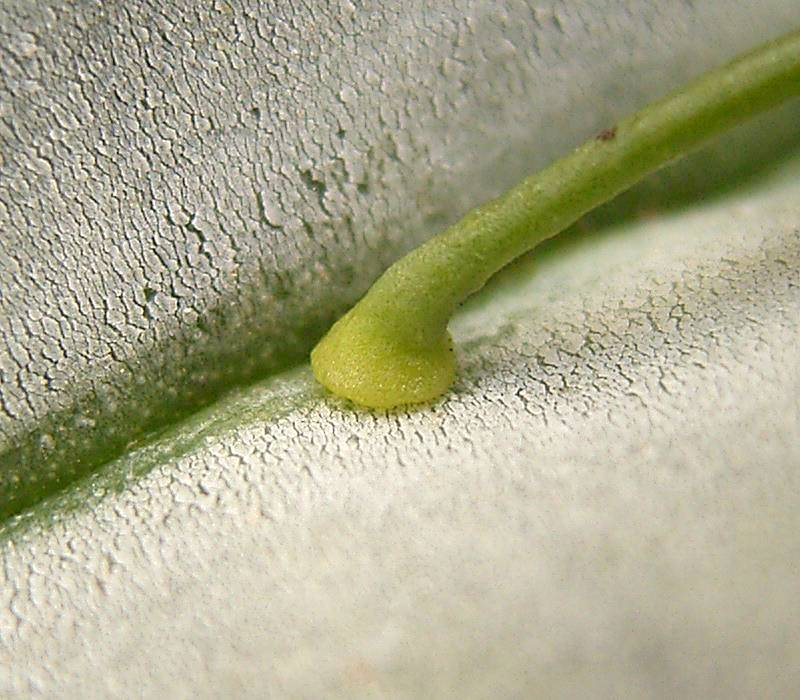
Day 30: The primary haustorium has developed.

== Literature ==
- William Henry Harvey: Flora Capensis 2: 581
- Robert Allen Dyer: Two Rare Parasites on Succulent Species of Euphorbia, Euphorbia Review Vol. I (4): 29-32, 1935
- Thomas Goebel: Viscum minimum Harvey in der Sukkulentensammlung der Stadt Zürich, Kakteen und andere Sukkulenten 29 (1), 1978
- Frank K. Horwood: Two parasites of Euphorbia: Viscum minimum and Hydnora africana, The Euphorbia Journal, Vol 1: 45-48, 1983
