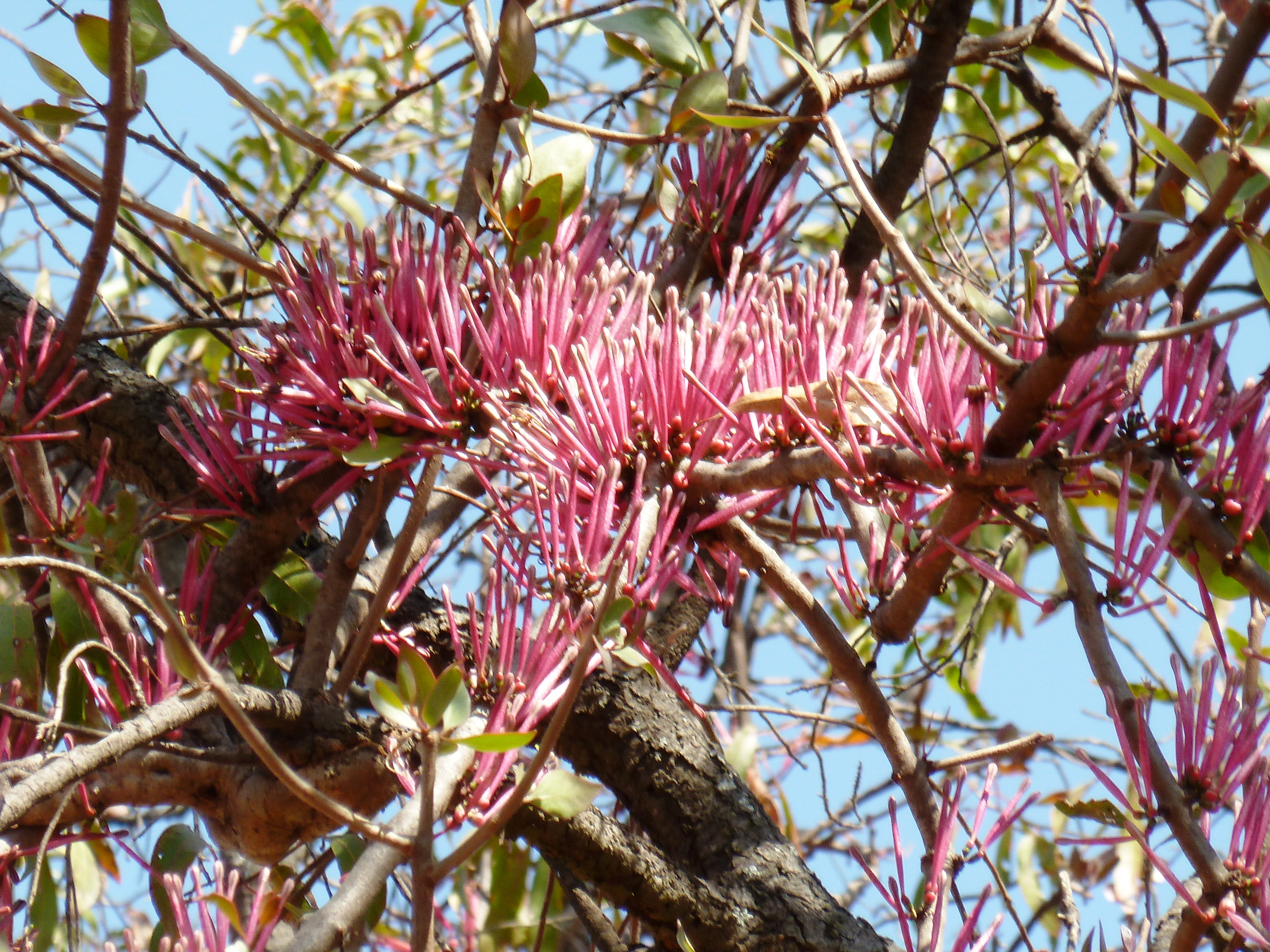
- Flowers of T. rubromarginatus

Scientific classification
- Kingdom: Plantae
- Clade: Tracheophytes
- Clade: Angiosperms
- Clade: Eudicots
- Order: Santalales
- Family: Loranthaceae
- Genus: Tapinanthus
- Species: T. rubromarginatus

Binomial name
- Tapinanthus rubromarginatus (Engl.) Danser

Synonyms
- Loranthus glabrifolius Conrath; Loranthus rubromarginatus Engl.

= Tapinanthus rubromarginatus =

Red mistletoe

Species of mistletoe

Tapinanthus rubromarginatus, commonly known as red mistletoe, is a species of plant in the family Loranthaceae. The leaf margins are red as reflected by the specific name rubro-, meaning "red", and marginatus meaning "margin".

== Range and hosts ==
It is native to northern South Africa, northwards of the Vaal and Pongola Rivers, and to the uplands of western and northern Eswatini. The host plants include Protea afra, Protea roupelliae and Faurea saligna.

== Description ==
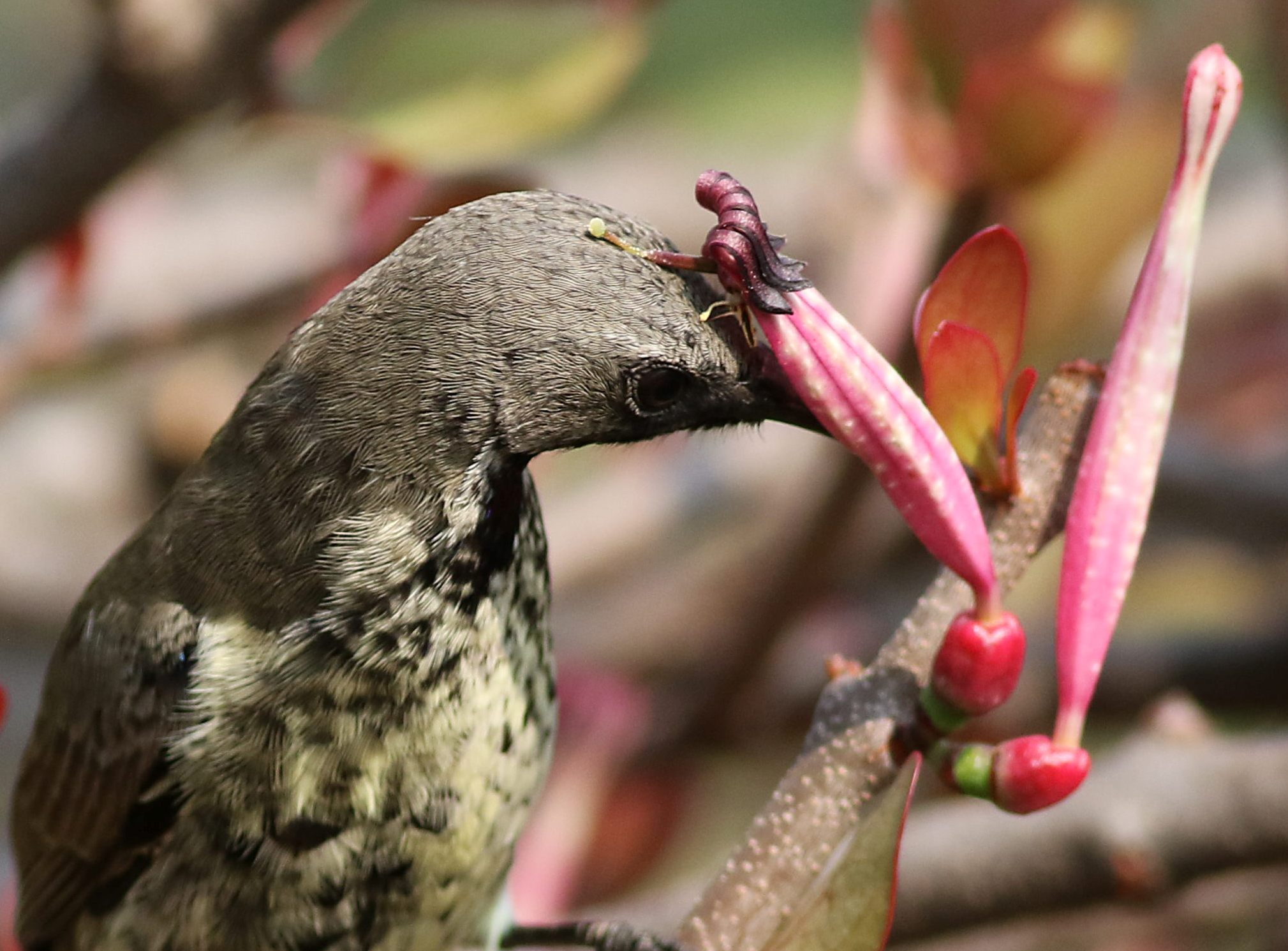
Sunbird feeding on T. rubromarginatus nectar, and assisting in pollination.

This is a deciduous, semi-parasitic aerial shrub, that attaches itself to the host plant by haustoria. The leaves are clustered in groups, and have narrow, dark red edges. The pinkish red flowers appear in spring, and the berries are similarly coloured.

== Reproduction ==
Sunbirds are attracted by the flower nectar and perform most of the pollination. The pistil and anthers make contact with the sunbird's crown feathers, as it probes the perianth tube. Several species of birds eat the sweet fruit, the seeds of which are coated with a thick, sticky glue. This glue sticks to the beak, and is wiped off on another branch, where the seed is deposited and eventually germinates.
