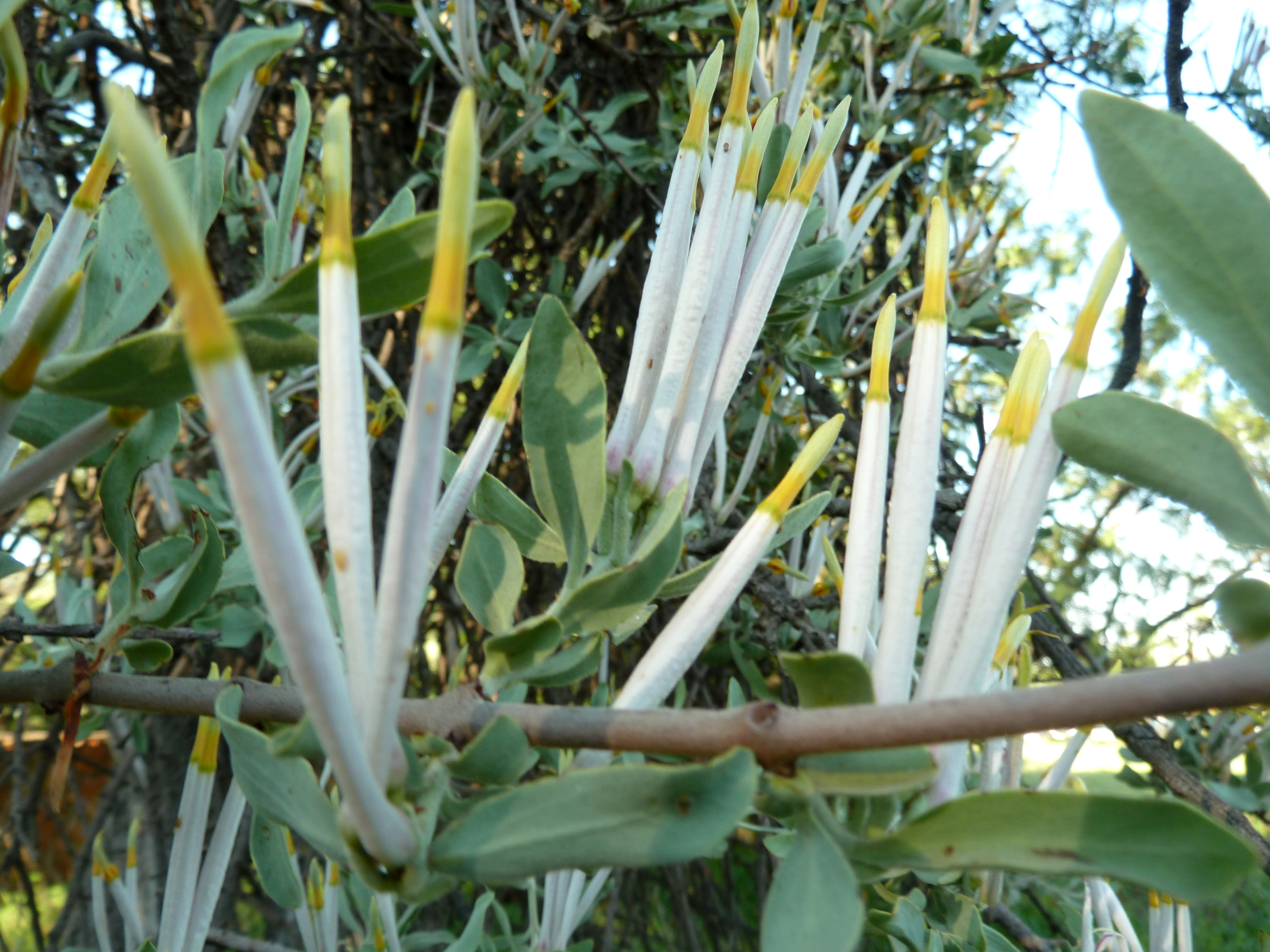
- Agelanthus natalitius

Scientific classification
- Kingdom: Plantae
- Clade: Tracheophytes
- Clade: Angiosperms
- Clade: Eudicots
- Order: Santalales
- Family: Loranthaceae
- Genus: Agelanthus
- Species: A. natalitius

Binomial name
- Agelanthus natalitius (Meisn.) Polhill & Wiens

Synonyms
- Acranthemum natalitium (Meisn.) Tiegh.; Loranthus natalitius Meisn. (1843) (basionym); Tapinanthus natalitius (Meisn.) Danser

= Agelanthus natalitius =

Species of mistletoe

Agelanthus natalitius is a species of hemiparasitic plant in the family Loranthaceae, which is native to Eswatini, Mozambique, Botswana, and Zimbabwe and to the Cape Provinces, KwaZulu-Natal, and Northern Provinces in South Africa.

== Habitat and ecology ==
A. natalitius is found in mixed woodland and bushland, usually on Acacias but sometimes on Combretum.

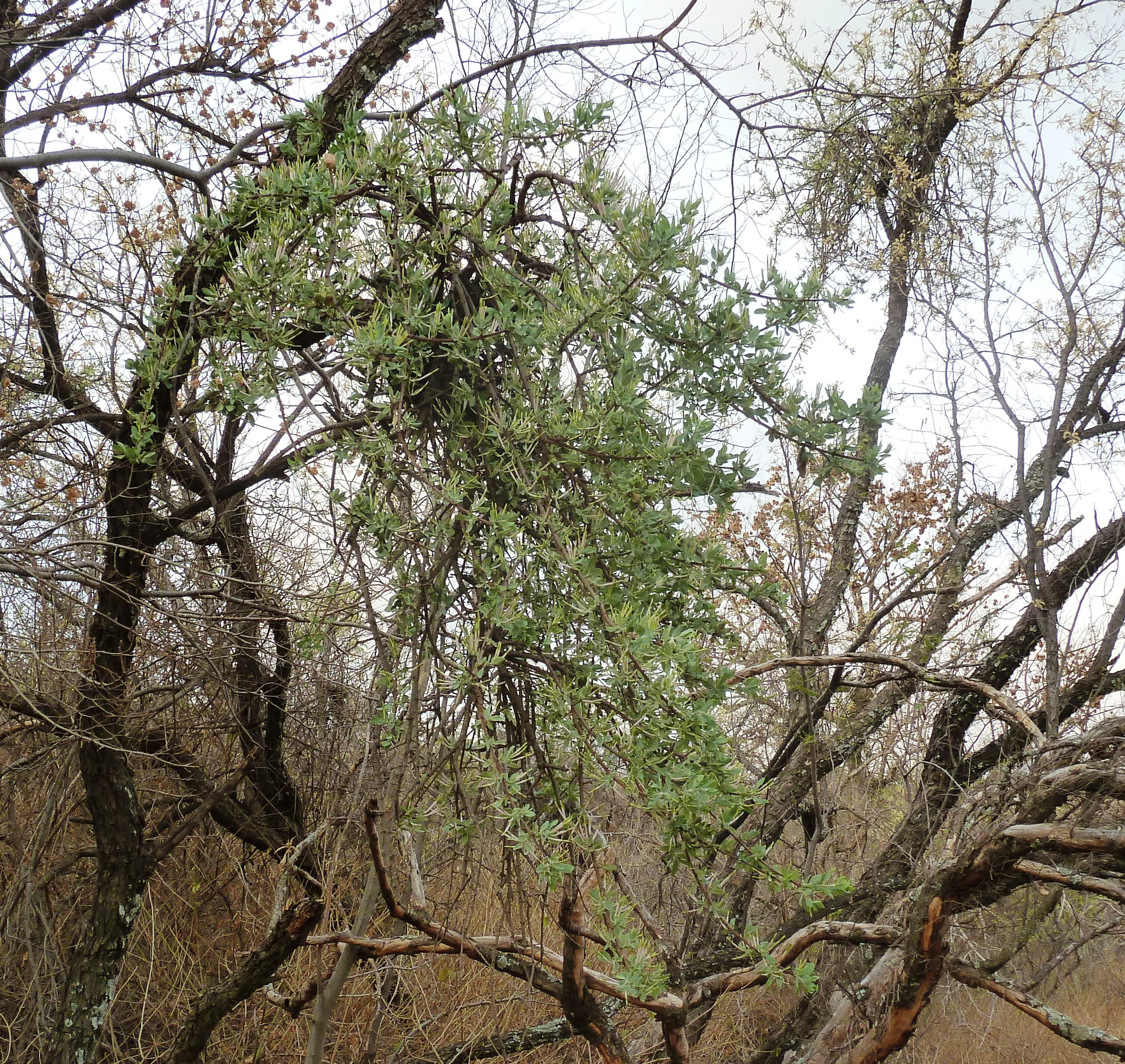
Habit of A. natalitius

== Subspecies ==
Two subspecies are accepted.

- Agelanthus natalitius subsp. natalitius
- Agelanthus natalitius subsp. zeyheri (Harv.) Polhill & Wiens
