= Red-berry mistletoe =

Red-berry mistletoe is a common name for several species of plants and may refer to:

- Viscum cruciatum
- Viscum rotundifolium
