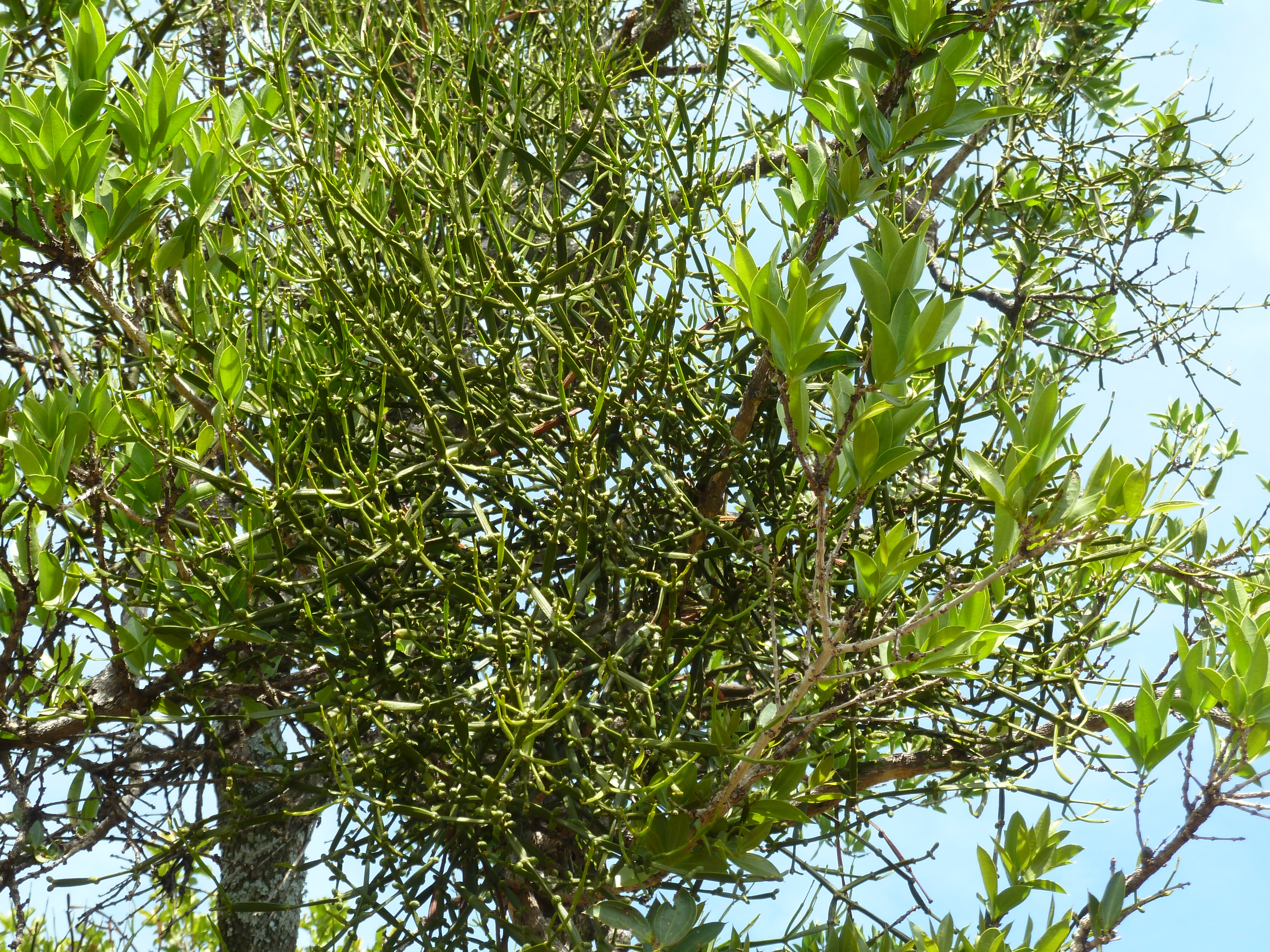
- V. combreticola on a Strychnos host

Scientific classification
- Kingdom: Plantae
- Clade: Tracheophytes
- Clade: Angiosperms
- Clade: Eudicots
- Order: Santalales
- Family: Santalaceae
- Genus: Viscum
- Species: V. combreticola

Binomial name
- Viscum combreticola Engl.

Synonyms
- V. dichotomum sensu Harv.; V. ugandense Sprague 1911; V. hildebrandtii auct. sensu Balle

= Viscum combreticola =

Species of shrub

Viscum combreticola, the Combretum mistletoe, is a leafless, dioecious mistletoe shrub, occurring from southern to tropical Africa, in a broad zone following the Rift Valleys. Though it is typically a hemiparasite of Combretum species, it may also be found on Terminalia (Combretaceae), Acacia, Croton, Diplorhynchus, Dombeya, Heteropyxis, Maytenus, Melia, Strychnos or Vangueria.

The much-branched twigs are flattened, ribbed and divided into clear segments. The brittle olive to olive-green segments exude a watery sap when broken. Their sessile fruit, usually in pairs, grow from the segment joints. They are ellipsoid berries of 6-7 mm in diameter, that are warty when young but smooth and orange when ripe.

The species is vegetatively similar to V. anceps and artificially resembles the Asian species V. dichotomum. Male inflorescences and fruit are required to separate it from V. shirense and V. cylindricum.
