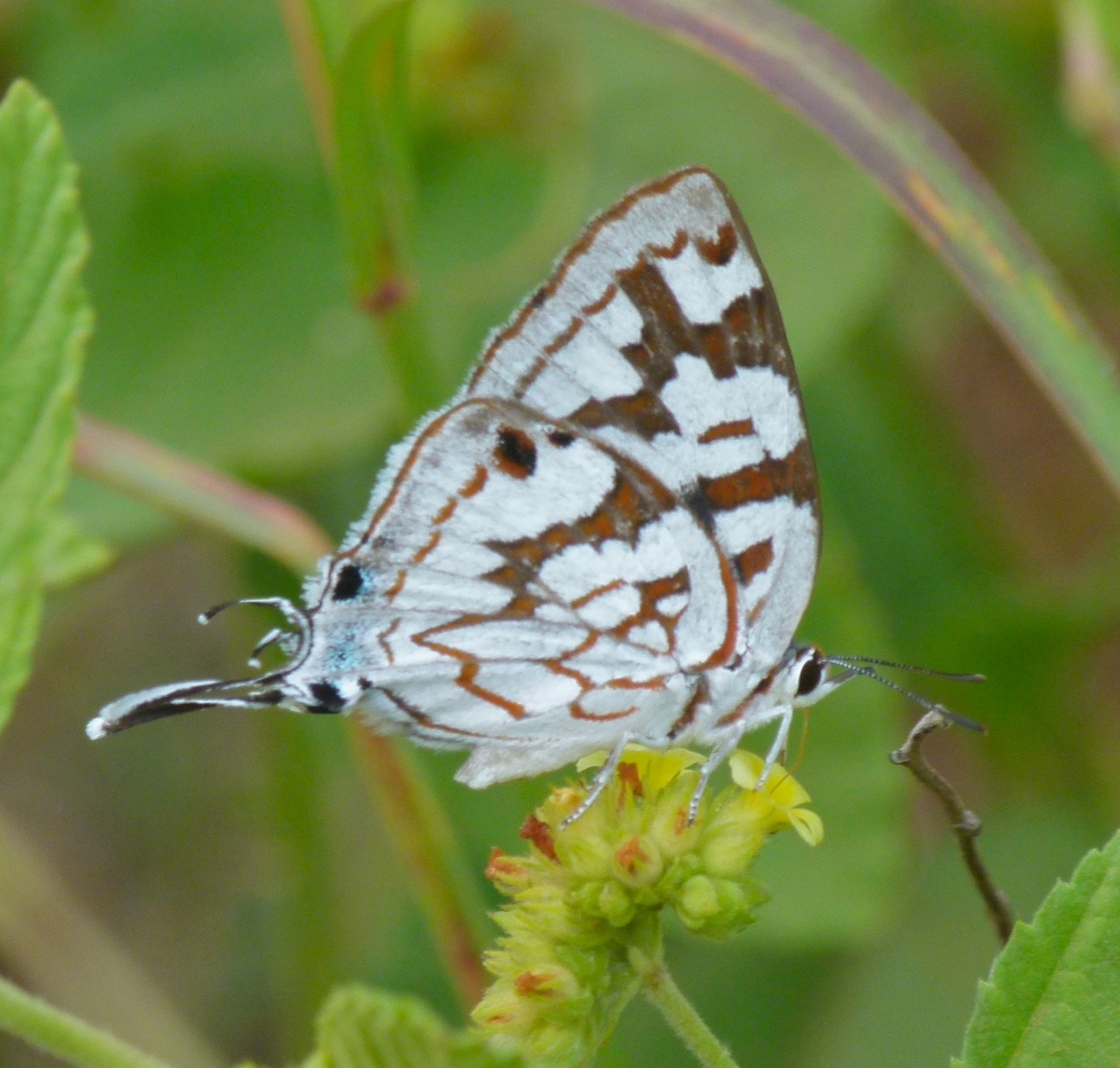

Scientific classification
- Kingdom: Animalia
- Phylum: Arthropoda
- Class: Insecta
- Order: Lepidoptera
- Family: Lycaenidae
- Genus: Stugeta
- Species: S. bowkeri

Binomial name
- Stugeta bowkeri (Trimen, 1864)

Synonyms
- Iolaus bowkeri Trimen, 1864; Stugeta maria Suffert, 1904; Iolaus (Stugeta) bowkeri albeza Koçak, 1996; Stugeta bowkeri f. caerulea Stempffer, 1947; Stugeta bowkeri f. mombasae Butler, 1901; Stugeta bowkeri var. nyanzana Wichgraf, 1911

= Stugeta bowkeri =

Bowker's sapphire

Species of butterfly

Stugeta bowkeri, the Bowker's sapphire, Bowker's marbled sapphire or Bowker's tailed blue, is a butterfly of the family Lycaenidae. It is found in most of southern Africa.

The wingspan is 26–32 mm for males and 29–41 mm for females. Adults are on wing from September to May, with peaks in October and March.

Larvae of subspecies bowkeri and henningi feed on Viscum rotundifolium. Larvae of subspecies tearei have been recorded on Ximenia afra and X. americana, Viscum rotundifolium and Tapinanthus quinquangulus. Other recorded food plants include Loranthus species (including L. elegans and L. oleaefolius) and other Tapinanthus and Ximenia species.

== Subspecies ==
- S. b. bowkeri – Cape, KwaZulu-Natal, Transvaal, Mozambique, Zimbabwe, Zambia
- S. b. albeza (Koçak, 1996) – Somalia
- S. b. caerulea Stempffer – Somalia (Galkayu)
- S. b. ethiopica Stempffer & Bennett, 1958 – Ethiopia
- S. b. henningi Dickson, 1980 – arid savannah of Free State, North West and Northern Cape provinces in South Africa
- S. b. kedonga van Someren, 1939 – the Great Rift Valley in Kenya
- S. b. maria Suffert, 1904 – Angola, Democratic Republic of the Congo: south-east to Lualaba and Shaba, Tanzania, northern Zambia
- S. b. mombasae Butler, 1901 – coast of eastern Kenya and north-eastern Tanzania
- S. b. nyanzana Wichgraf, 1911 – Lake Victoria, western Kenya
- S. b. nyasana Talbot, 1935 – Malawi, south-eastern Tanzania
- S. b. tearei Dickson, 1980 – southern Zambia, Mozambique, Zimbabwe, Botswana, northern Namibia, Eswatini, South Africa: Limpopo, Mpumalanga, North West, Gauteng and KwaZulu-Natal provinces

== Etymology ==
The name honours the lepidopterist James Henry Bowker.
