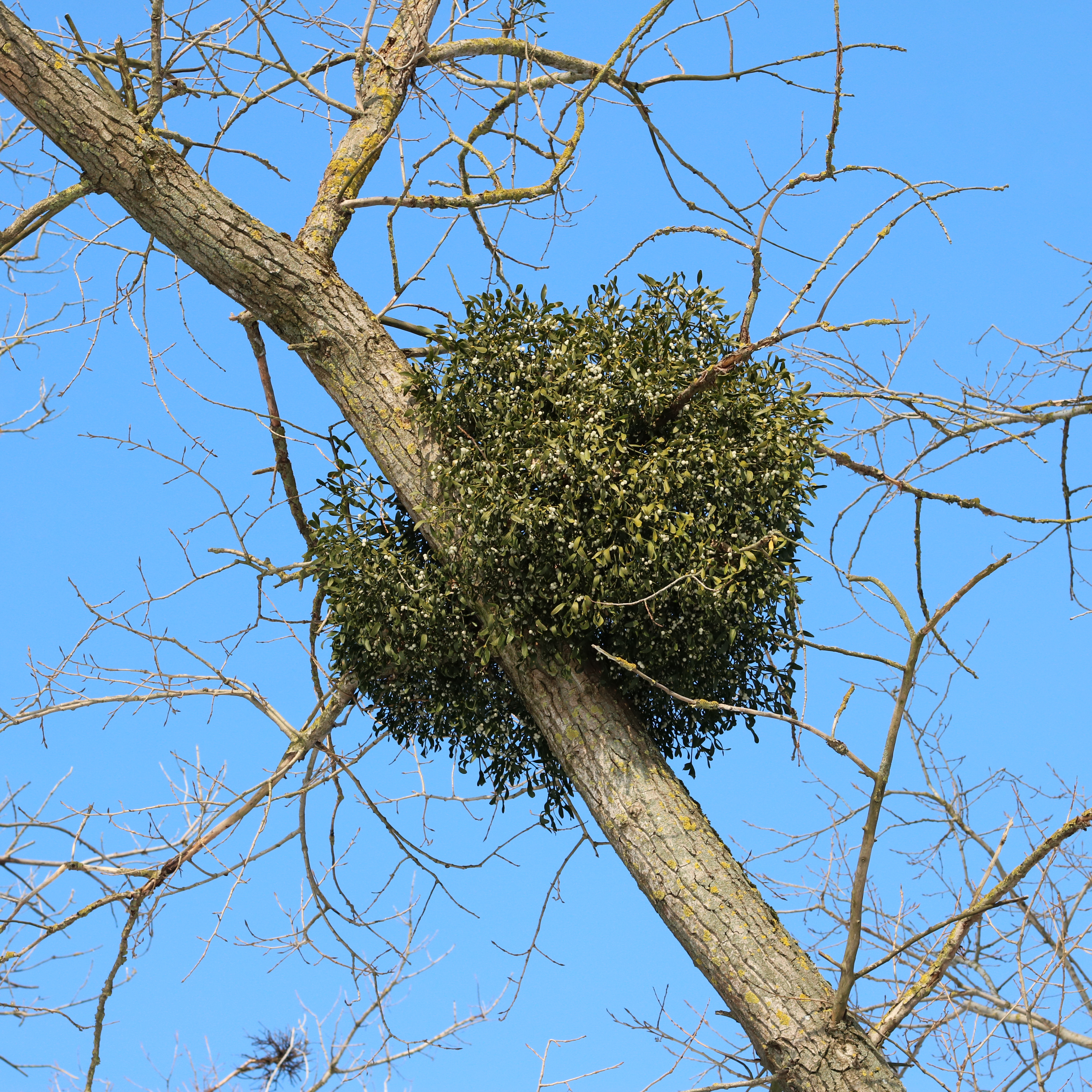
- Viscum album growing on a Populus species

Scientific classification
- Kingdom: Plantae
- Clade: Tracheophytes
- Clade: Angiosperms
- Clade: Eudicots
- Order: Santalales
- Family: Santalaceae
- Genus: Viscum; L.

Type species
- Viscum album L.

Species
- See text

Synonyms
- Aspidixia Tiegh.; Stelin Bubani

= Viscum =

Genus of mistletoes

Viscum is a genus of over 100 species of mistletoes, native to temperate and tropical regions of Europe, Africa, Asia and Australasia. Traditionally, the genus has been placed in its own family Viscaceae, but recent genetic research by the Angiosperm Phylogeny Group shows this family to be correctly placed within a larger circumscription of the sandalwood family, Santalaceae. Its name is the origin of the English word viscous, after the Latin viscum, a sticky bird lime made from the plants' berries.

They are woody, obligate hemiparasitic shrubs with branches 15–80 centimetres (5.9–31.5 in) long. Their hosts are woody shrubs and trees. The foliage is dichotomously or verticillately branching, with opposite pairs or whorls of green leaves which perform some photosynthesis (minimal in some species, notably V. nudum), but with the plant drawing its mineral and water needs from the host tree. Different species of Viscum tend to use different host species; most species are able to use several different host species.

The flowers are inconspicuous, greenish-yellow, 1–3 millimetres (0.039–0.118 in) diameter. The fruit is a berry, white, yellow, orange, or red when mature, containing one or more seeds embedded in very sticky juice; the seeds are dispersed when birds (notably the mistle thrush) eat the fruit, and remove the sticky seeds from the bill by wiping them on tree branches where they can germinate.

== Toxicity in the genus Viscum ==
Viscum species are poisonous to humans; eating the fruit causes a weak pulse and acute gastrointestinal problems including stomach pain and diarrhea. At least one of the active ingredients is the lectin viscumin, which is intensely toxic. It inhibits protein synthesis by catalytically inactivating ribosomes. In spite of this, many species of animals are adapted to eating the fruit as a significant part of their diet.

== Fossil record ==
†Viscum morlotii from the early Miocene, has been described from fossil leaf compressions that have been found in the Kristina Mine at Hrádek nad Nisou in North Bohemia, the Czech Republic.

== Species ==
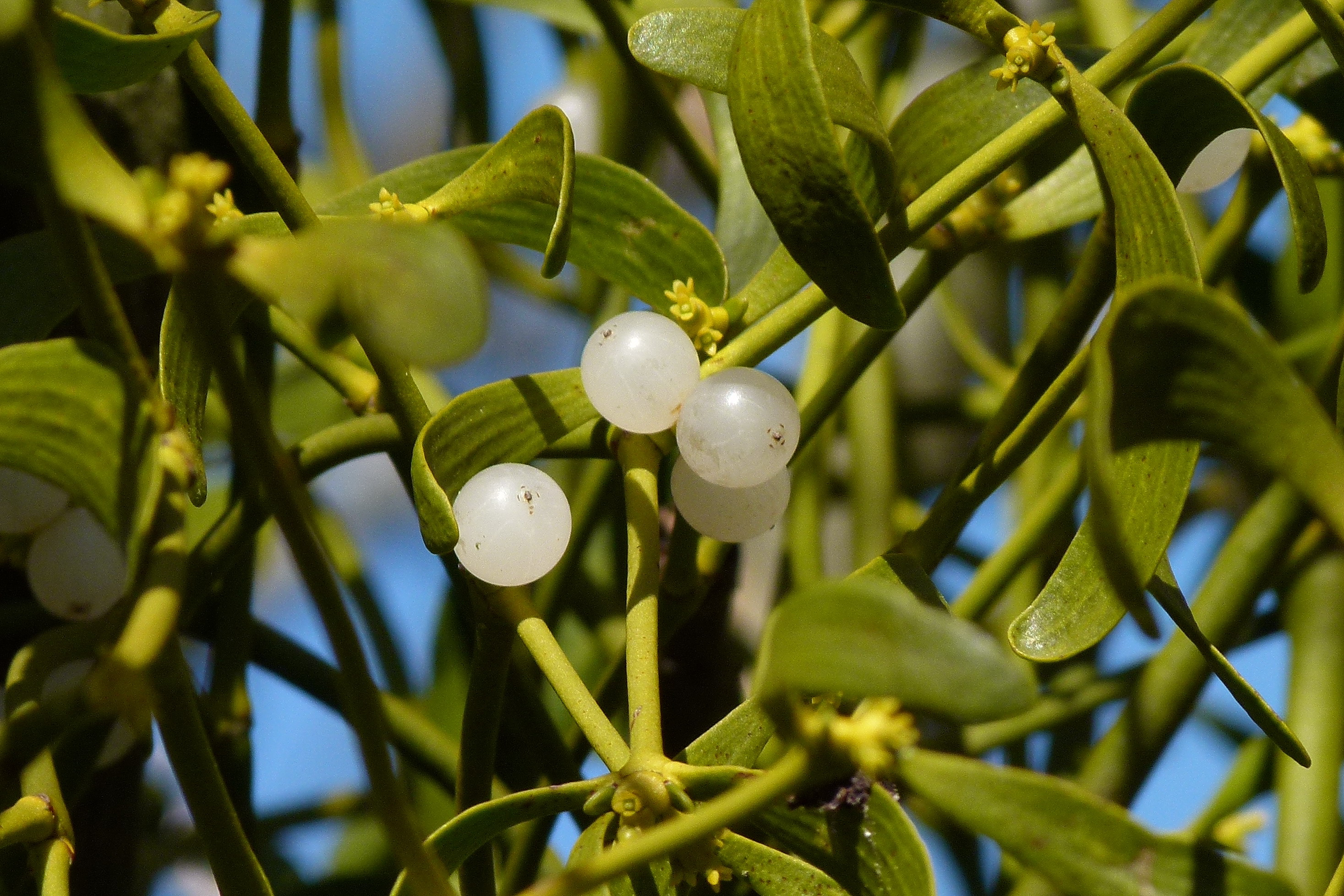
Mistletoe Viscum album with berries

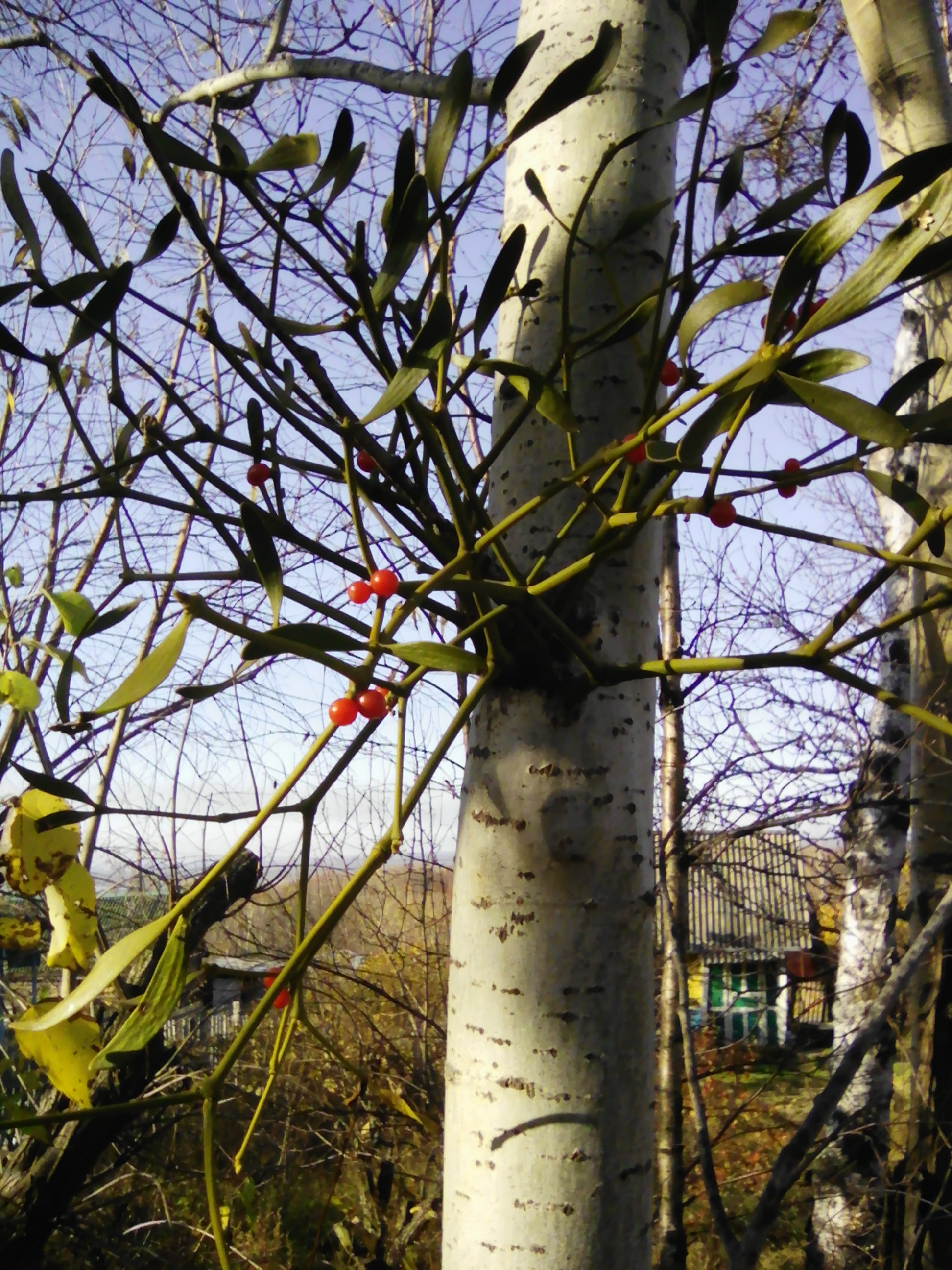
Viscum coloratum on Aspen

112 species are accepted.

- Viscum acaciae Danser
- Viscum album L. – European mistletoe
- Viscum ambongoense Balle
- Viscum angulatum B.Heyne ex DC.
- Viscum apiculatum Lecomte
- Viscum articulatum Burm.f.
- Viscum bagshawei Rendle
- Viscum bancroftii Blakely
- Viscum bandipurense Thriveni, Shivam., Amruthesh, Vijay & Sadanand
- Viscum birmanicum Gand.
- Viscum boivinii Tiegh.
- Viscum calcaratum Lecomte ex Balle
- Viscum calvinii Polhill & Wiens
- Viscum capense L.f. – Cape mistletoe (South Africa)
- Viscum capitellatum Sm.
- Viscum ceibarum Balle
- Viscum chyuluense Polhill & Wiens
- Viscum coloratum (Kom.) Nakai – Korean mistletoe (Korea)
- Viscum combreticola Engl. – combretum mistletoe
- Viscum congdonii Polhill & Wiens
- Viscum congolense De Wild. & T.Durand
- Viscum continuum E.Mey. ex Sprague
- Viscum coursii Balle
- Viscum crassulae Eckl. & Zeyh.
- Viscum cruciatum Sieber ex Boiss. – red-berried mistletoe
- Viscum cuneifolium Baker
- Viscum cylindricum Polhill & Wiens
- Viscum decaryi Lecomte
- Viscum decurrens (Engl.) Baker & Sprague
- Viscum dielsianum Dinter ex Neusser
- Viscum diospyrosicola Hayata
- Viscum dryophilum Rech.f.
- Viscum echinocarpum Baker
- Viscum engleri Tiegh.
- Viscum exiguum Polhill & Wiens
- Viscum exile Barlow
- Viscum fargesii Lecomte
- Viscum fastigiatum Balle
- Viscum fischeri Engl.
- Viscum goetzei Engl.
- Viscum grandicaule Polhill & Wiens
- Viscum griseum Polhill & Wiens
- Viscum hainanense R.L.Han & D.X.Zhang
- Viscum hexapterum Balle
- Viscum heyneanum DC.
- Viscum hildebrandtii Engl.
- Viscum hoolei (Wiens) Polhill & Wiens
- Viscum indosinense Danser
- Viscum iringense Polhill & Wiens
- Viscum itrafanaombense Balle
- Viscum junodii (Tiegh.) Engl.
- Viscum katikianum Barlow
- Viscum liquidambaricola Hayata
- Viscum littorum Polhill & Wiens
- Viscum longiarticulatum Engl.
- Viscum longipetiolatum Balle
- Viscum lophiocladum Baker
- Viscum loranthi Elmer
- Viscum loranthicola Polhill & Wiens
- Viscum luisengense Polhill & Wiens
- Viscum macrofalcatum R.L.Han & D.X.Zhang
- Viscum malurianum Sanjai & N.P.Balakr.
- Viscum menyharthii Engl. & Schinz
- Viscum meyeri Sosnovsky, Krasyl. & Nachychko
- Viscum minimum Harv.
- Viscum monoicum Roxb. ex DC.
- Viscum multicostatum Baker
- Viscum multiflorum Lecomte
- Viscum multinerve (Hayata) Hayata
- Viscum multipedunculatum Lecomte
- Viscum myriophlebium Baker
- Viscum mysorense Gamble
- Viscum nepalense Spreng.
- Viscum nudum Danser
- Viscum obovatum Harv.
- Viscum obscurum Thunb.
- Viscum oreophilum Wiens
- Viscum orientale Willd.
- Viscum ovalifolium Wall. ex DC.
- Viscum pauciflorum L.f.
- Viscum pentanthum Baker
- Viscum perrieri Lecomte
- Viscum petiolatum Polhill & Wiens
- Viscum radula Baker
- Viscum ramosissimum Roxb. ex DC.
- Viscum rhipsaloides Baker
- Viscum roncartii Balle
- Viscum rotundifolium L.f. – round-leaved or red-berry mistletoe
- Viscum sahyadricum Sardesai, S.P.Gaikwad & S.R.Yadav
- Viscum schaeferi Engl. & K.Krause
- Viscum schimperi Engl.
- Viscum scurruloideum Barlow
- Viscum semialatum Lecomte
- Viscum songimveloensis Oosth. & K.Balkwill
- Viscum stenocarpum Danser
- Viscum subracemosum Sanjai & N.P.Balakr.
- Viscum subserratum Schltr.
- Viscum subverrucosum Polhill & Wiens
- Viscum taiwanianum S.S.Ying
- Viscum tenue Engl.
- Viscum tieghemii Balle
- Viscum trachycarpum Baker
- Viscum triflorum DC.
- Viscum trilobatum Talbot
- Viscum tsaratananense Lecomte
- Viscum tsiafajavonense Balle
- Viscum tuberculatum A.Rich.
- Viscum verrucosum Harv.
- Viscum vohimavoense Balle
- Viscum whitei Blakely
- Viscum wrayi King ex Gamble
- Viscum yunnanense H.S.Kiu

== Other sources ==
- Flora of China: Viscum
- Flora of Pakistan: Viscum
- Flora Europaea: Viscum
- "Viscum L." Australian Plant Name Index (APNI), IBIS database. Canberra, Australian Capital Territory: Centre for Plant Biodiversity Research, Australian Government.
- Mistletoe Pages: Viscum
