= Viscum exile =

Scientific classification
- Kingdom: Plantae
- Clade: Tracheophytes
- Clade: Angiosperms
- Clade: Eudicots
- Order: Santalales
- Family: Santalaceae
- Genus: Viscum
- Species: V. exile

Binomial name
- Viscum exile Barlow

Species of epiphyte

Viscum exile is a species of mistletoe in the family Santalaceae. It is a parasitic plant native to Sulawesi.
