= Kissing bough =

Traditional Christmas decoration in England

A kissing bough is a traditional Christmas decoration in England and Lowland Scotland. Also called a Christmas-bough or mistletoe-bough, it has the shape of a sphere or globe with a frame made of wire. The whole frame is covered with greenery. Red apples or oranges may be hung from ribbons in the centre and mistletoe is tied below. Additionally candles may be clipped to the frame and bright streamers are attached to the top. Another form that the kissing bough can take is that of a crown with a structure composed of only the top half of the globe.
