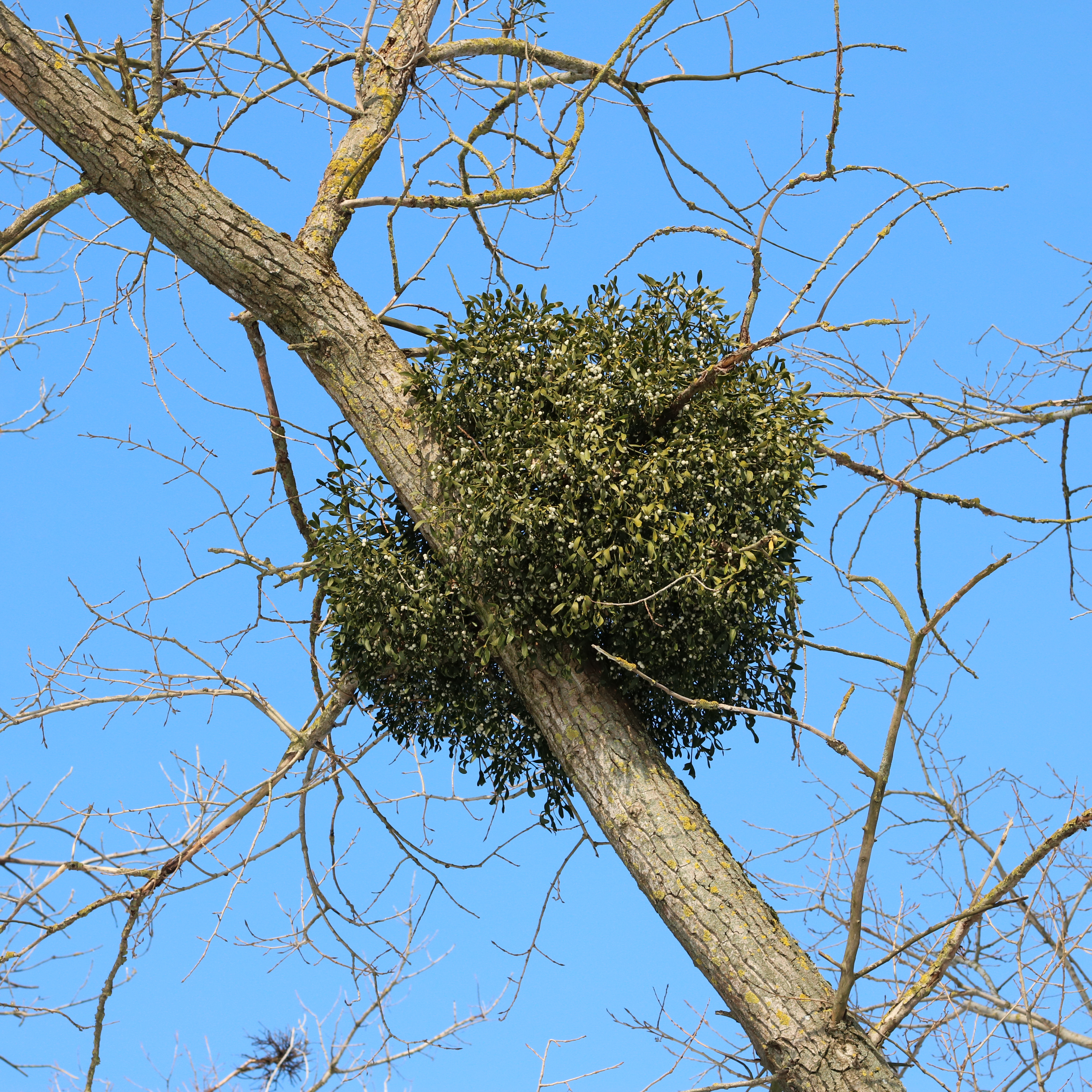
- Evergreen Viscum album in winter, growing on Populus tremula

Conservation status
- Least Concern (IUCN 3.1)

Scientific classification
- Kingdom: Plantae
- Clade: Tracheophytes
- Clade: Angiosperms
- Clade: Eudicots
- Order: Santalales
- Family: Santalaceae
- Genus: Viscum
- Species: V. album

Binomial name
- Viscum album L.

= Viscum album =

Species of flowering plant

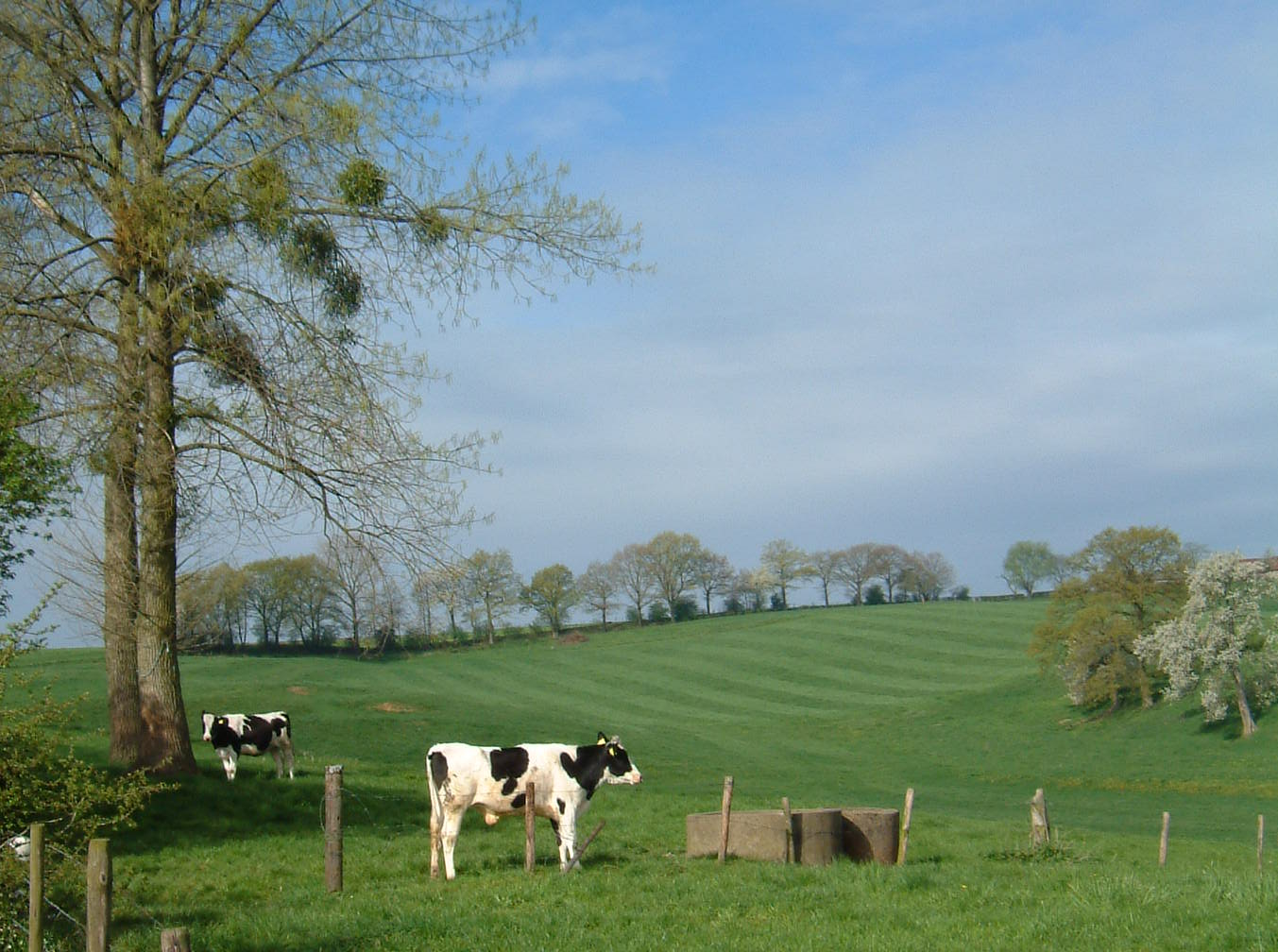
Viscum album growing on winter dormant trees in the Netherlands

Viscum album is a species of mistletoe in the family Santalaceae, commonly called European mistletoe, common mistletoe, or simply mistletoe (Old English mistle). It is native to Europe, as well as western and southern Asia. V. album is found only rarely in North America, as an introduced species.

Viscum album is a hemiparasite on several species of trees, from which it draws water and nutrients. It has a significant role in European mythology, legends, and customs. In modern times, it is commonly featured among Christmas decorations and symbology. In North America its cultural roles are usually fulfilled by the similar native species, Phoradendron leucarpum.

Long used in alternative medicine traditions without any academic basis, mistletoe now is under study for pharmaceutical uses in modern medicine.

== Description ==
It is a hemi-parasitic evergreen shrub, which grows on the stems of other trees. The plant contains a haustorium that connects it to the host tree by connecting the xylem and phloem of the mistletoe to that of the host tree, which allows it to receive nutrients and water. It has stems 30–100 centimetres (12–39 in) long with dichotomous branching. The leaves are in opposite pairs, strap-shaped, entire, leathery textured, 2–8 centimetres (0.79–3.15 in) long, 0.8–2.5 centimetres (0.31–0.98 in) broad and are a yellowish-green in colour. This species is dioecious and the insect-pollinated flowers are inconspicuous, yellowish-green, 2–3 millimetres (0.079–0.118 in) diameter. The fruit is a white or yellow berry, and except for very rarely, containing one seed embedded in the very sticky, glutinous fruit pulp.

It is commonly found in the crowns of broad-leaved trees, particularly apple, lime (linden), hawthorn, and poplar.

European mistletoe is the only multicellular organism known to lack a functioning respiratory complex I in its electron transport chain, a protein that is essential for the creation of useful energy for its cells. It is believed to survive by obtaining adenosine triphosphate and energy-rich compounds from its host as well as reorganizing its other respiratory complexes and slowing its growth and energy requirements.

== Classification ==
The mistletoe was one of the many species originally described by the Swedish scientist Linnaeus. Its species name is the Latin adjective albus, "white". It and the other members of the genus Viscum were originally classified in the mistletoe family Viscaceae, but this family has since been reclassified into the larger family Santalaceae.

=== Subspecies ===
Several subspecies are commonly accepted. They differ in fruit colour, leaf shape and size, and most obviously in the host trees used.

- Viscum album subsp. abietis (Wiesb.) Abromeit. Central Europe. Fruit white; leaves up to 8 centimetres (3.1 in). On Abies.
- Viscum album subsp. album. Europe, southwest Asia east to Nepal. Fruit white; leaves 3–5 centimetres (1.2–2.0 in). On Malus, Populus, Tilia, and less often on numerous other species, including (rarely) Quercus.
- Viscum album subsp. austriacum (Wiesb.) Vollmann. Fruit yellow; leaves 2–4 centimetres (0.79–1.57 in). Central Europe. On Larix, Pinus, Picea.
- Viscum album subsp. meridianum (Danser) D.G.Long. Southeast Asia. Fruit yellow; leaves 3–5 centimetres (1.2–2.0 in). On Acer, Carpinus, Juglans, Prunus, Sorbus.
- Viscum album subsp. creticum has recently been described from eastern Crete. Fruit white; leaves short. On Pinus brutia.
- Viscum album subsp. coloratum Kom. is treated by the Flora of China as a distinct species Viscum coloratum (Kom) Nakai.

== Genetics ==
The European mistletoe has one of the largest genomes of all organisms, at about 90 billion base pairs (compared to ~3 billion bp in the human genome). It encodes 39,092 distinct open reading frames encoding 32,064 proteins.

== Toxicity ==
If ingested in a concentrated form, such as a herbal tea infusion, European mistletoe is potentially fatal. People have been known to become seriously ill from eating the berries.

The toxic lectin viscumin has been isolated from Viscum album. Viscumin is a cytotoxic protein (ribosome inactivating protein, or RIP) that binds to galactose residues of cell surface glycoproteins and may be internalised by endocytosis. Viscumin strongly inhibits protein synthesis by inactivating the 60 S ribosomal subunit. The structure of this protein is very similar to other RIPs, showing the most resemblance to ricin and abrin.

Some birds have immunity to the toxin and enjoy the berries, especially the mistle thrush that is so named because mistletoe is their favourite food. Birds are especially important in distributing the seeds of the plant to new locations in the trees in which it will grow.

== Cultural folklore and mythology ==
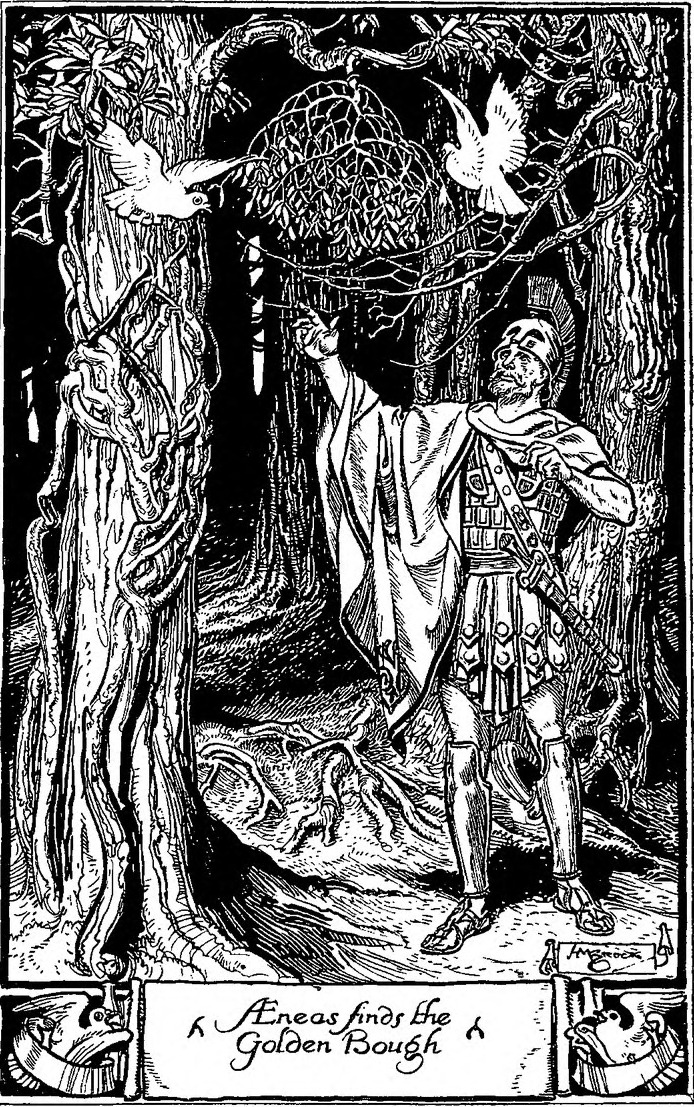
Roman ancestor Aeneas finds the Golden Bough.

European mistletoe features in many myths and legends, from early written sources into the modern period. In cultures across pre-Christian Europe, mistletoe was often seen as a representation of divine male essence (and thus romance, fertility, and vitality).

The stomach contents of ancient sacrifice victims buried in bogs, is always found to be a porridge containing mistletoe berries.

=== Ancient Greek and Roman ===
Mistletoe figured prominently in Greek mythology, and is believed to be the Golden Bough of Aeneas, ancestor of the Romans. In Ancient Greek mythology, mistletoe was used by heroes to access the underworld. The Romans associated mistletoe with peace, love, and understanding. They hung mistletoe over doorways to protect the household.

=== Celtic ===
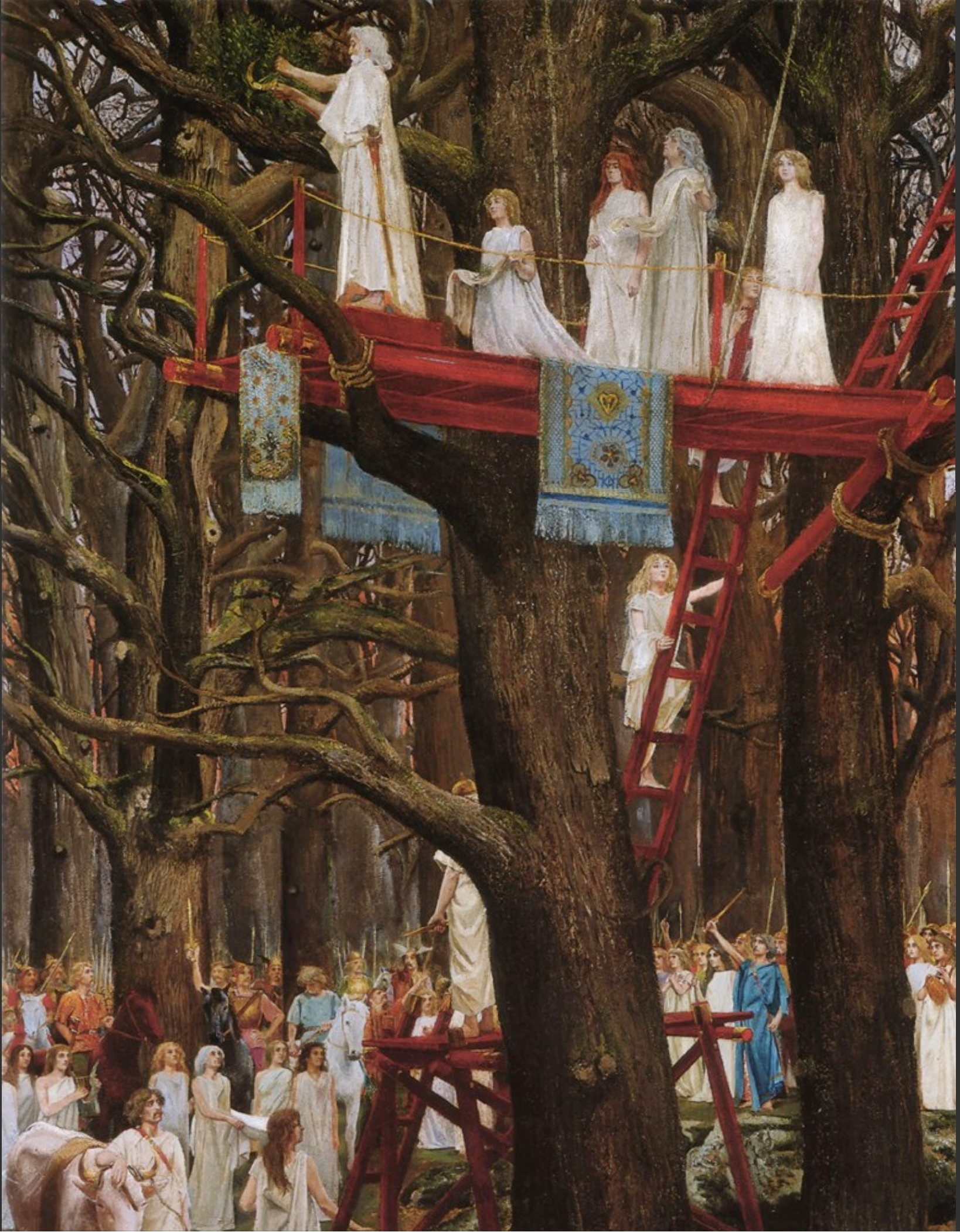
The oak and mistletoe ritual depicted by Henri-Paul Motte (1900)

Pliny the Elder makes an account in his Natural History about the Celtic religious Ritual of oak and mistletoe, in which druids would climb oak trees to cut down the mistletoe growing on it where it would then be turned into an elixir said to cure infertility and the effects of poison.

"We should not omit to mention the great admiration that the Gauls have for it as well. The druids – that is what they call their magicians – hold nothing more sacred than the mistletoe and a tree on which it is growing, provided it is a hard-timbered oak .... Mistletoe is rare and when found it is gathered with great ceremony, and particularly on the sixth day of the moon.... Hailing the moon in a native word that means 'healing all things,' they prepare a ritual sacrifice and banquet beneath a tree and bring up two white bulls, whose horns are bound for the first time on this occasion. A priest arrayed in white vestments climbs the tree and, with a golden sickle, cuts down the mistletoe, which is caught in a white cloak. Then finally they kill the victims, praying to a god to render his gift propitious to those on whom he has bestowed it. They believe that mistletoe given in drink will impart fertility to any animal that is barren and that it is an antidote to all poisons."

— Pliny the Elder,

=== Germanic ===
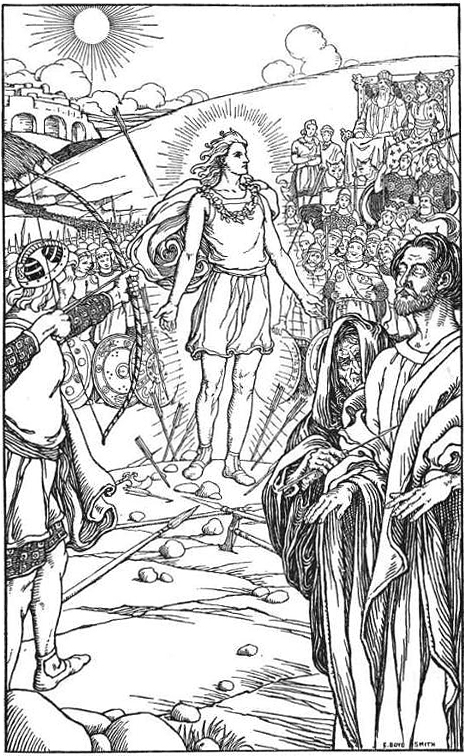
Each arrow overshot his head (1902) by Elmer Boyd Smith, depicts the blind god Höðr shooting his brother, the god Baldr, with a mistletoe arrow

"Things" are governing assemblies or forums in early Germanic society and similar gatherings appear in German mythology and historical accounts of the religious and social practices of the culture. Mistletoe appears in the thirteenth century Prose Edda account of German traditions. One account relates that the goddess Frigg required that everything swear an oath not to hurt her son Baldr, except for mistletoe, because "it seemed too young" to be a threat to her son. At thing gatherings of deities that followed, other deities began to have fun by shooting at him, or hurling stones, without him being injured at all. At one gathering however, Loki, wishing Baldr dead, tricked the blind god Höðr who was Baldr's brother, into throwing mistletoe at Baldr, killing him.

In another version of the myth in Gesta Danorum, Baldr and Höðr are rival suitors for Nanna, and Höðr kills Baldr with a sword named Mistilteinn (Old Norse "mistletoe"). Additionally, a sword by the same name also appears in Hervarar saga ok Heiðreks and Hrómundar saga Gripssonar.

=== Christian ===
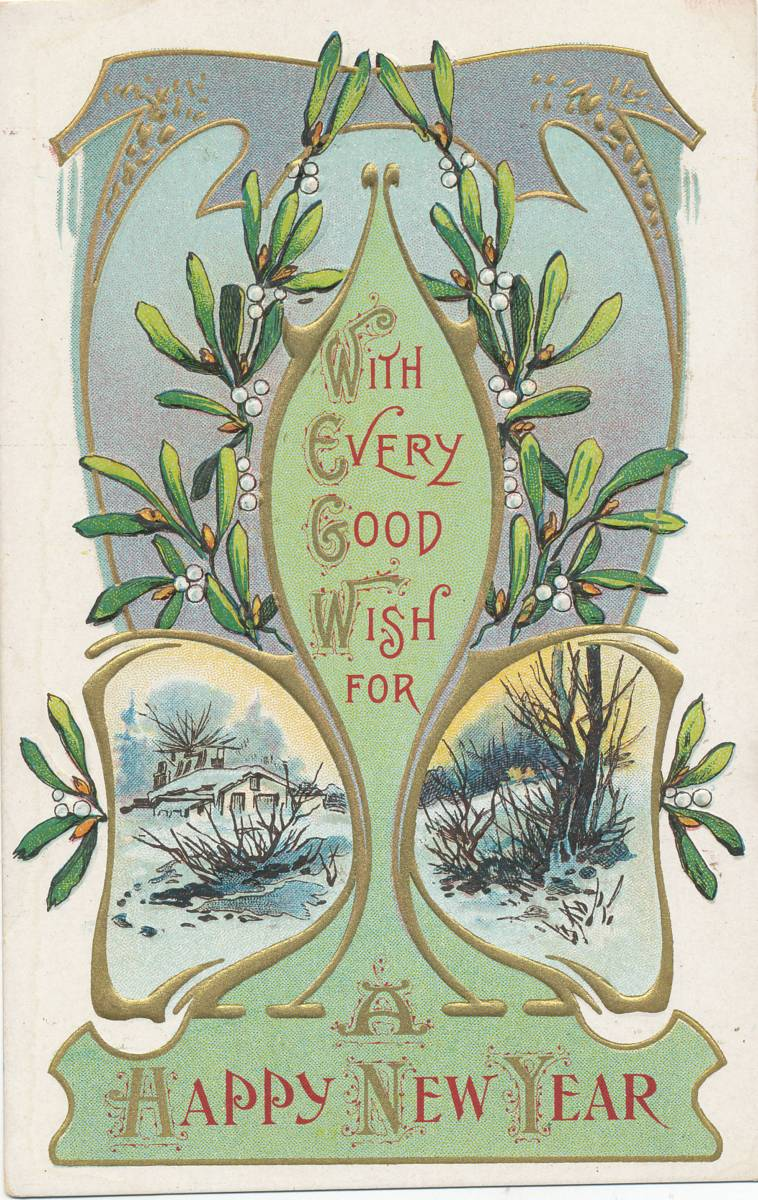
Mistletoe postcard, circa 1900

When Christianity became widespread in Europe after the third century AD, the ancient religious or mystical respect for the mistletoe plant was absorbed only as a cultural tradition. In some way that is not presently understood, this may have led to the widespread custom of kissing under the mistletoe plant during the Christmas season.

The earliest documented evidence of the tradition of kissing under the mistletoe dates from sixteenth century England, a custom that was apparently very popular at that time.

Winston Graham reports a Cornish tradition that mistletoe was originally a fine tree from which the wood of the Cross was made, but afterward it was condemned to live on only as a parasite.

Mistletoe is commonly used as a Christmas decoration, although such use was rarely alluded to until the eighteenth century. According to custom, the mistletoe must not touch the ground between its cutting and its removal as the last of Christmas greens at Candlemas. It may remain hanging throughout the year, often to preserve the house from lightning or fire, until it is replaced the following Christmas Eve. This tradition has spread throughout the English-speaking world, but is largely unknown in the rest of Europe. (The similar native species Phoradendron leucarpum is used in North America in lieu of the European Viscum album.)

According to an old Christmas custom, a man and a woman who meet under a hanging of mistletoe were obliged to kiss. The custom may be of Scandinavian origin. It was alluded to as common practice in 1808 and described in 1820 by American author Washington Irving in his The Sketch Book of Geoffrey Crayon, Gent.:

The mistletoe is still hung up in farm-houses and kitchens at Christmas, and the young men have the privilege of kissing the girls under it, plucking each time a berry from the bush. When the berries are all plucked the privilege ceases.

In Germany, the Christmas tradition is that people who kiss under mistletoe will have an enduring love or are bound to marry one another.

=== Other traditions ===
Every year, the UK town of Tenbury Wells holds a mistletoe festival and crowns a 'Mistletoe Queen'.

Mistletoe is the county flower of Herefordshire. It was voted such in 2002, following a poll by the wild plant conservation charity Plantlife.

== Contemporary uses ==
=== Lexicographic ===
The Latin word viscum, 'mistletoe, birdlime' is the source of viscous.

=== Bird trapping ===
The sticky juice of mistletoe berries was used to make birdlime, an adhesive to trap small animals or birds.

=== Flavoring ===
Mistletoe is an ingredient of biska, a pomace brandy-based liquor made in Istria.

=== Medicinal ===
Mistletoe leaves and young twigs are used by herbalists and preparations made from them are popular in Europe, especially in Germany, for attempting to treat circulatory and respiratory system problems. Use of mistletoe extract in the treatment of cancer originated with Rudolf Steiner, the founder of Anthroposophy.

=== Scientific research ===
Although laboratory and animal experiments have suggested that mistletoe extract may affect the immune system and be able to kill some kinds of cancer cells, as of 2024, there is little evidence of its benefit to people with cancer. However, more pharmaceutical research on mistletoe is in progress.

== Gallery ==
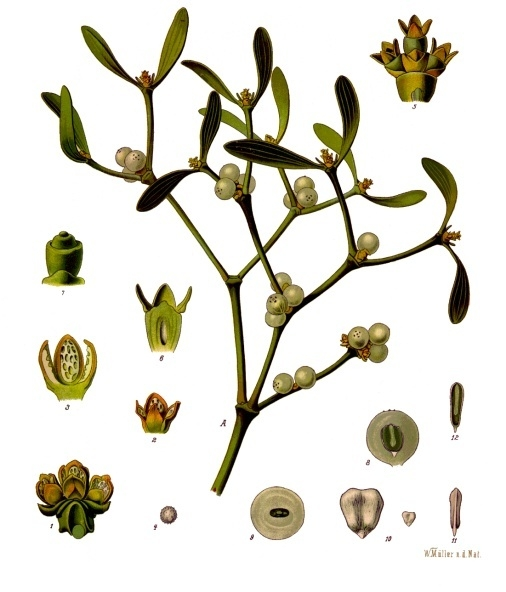
19th century illustration by Franz Eugen Köhler

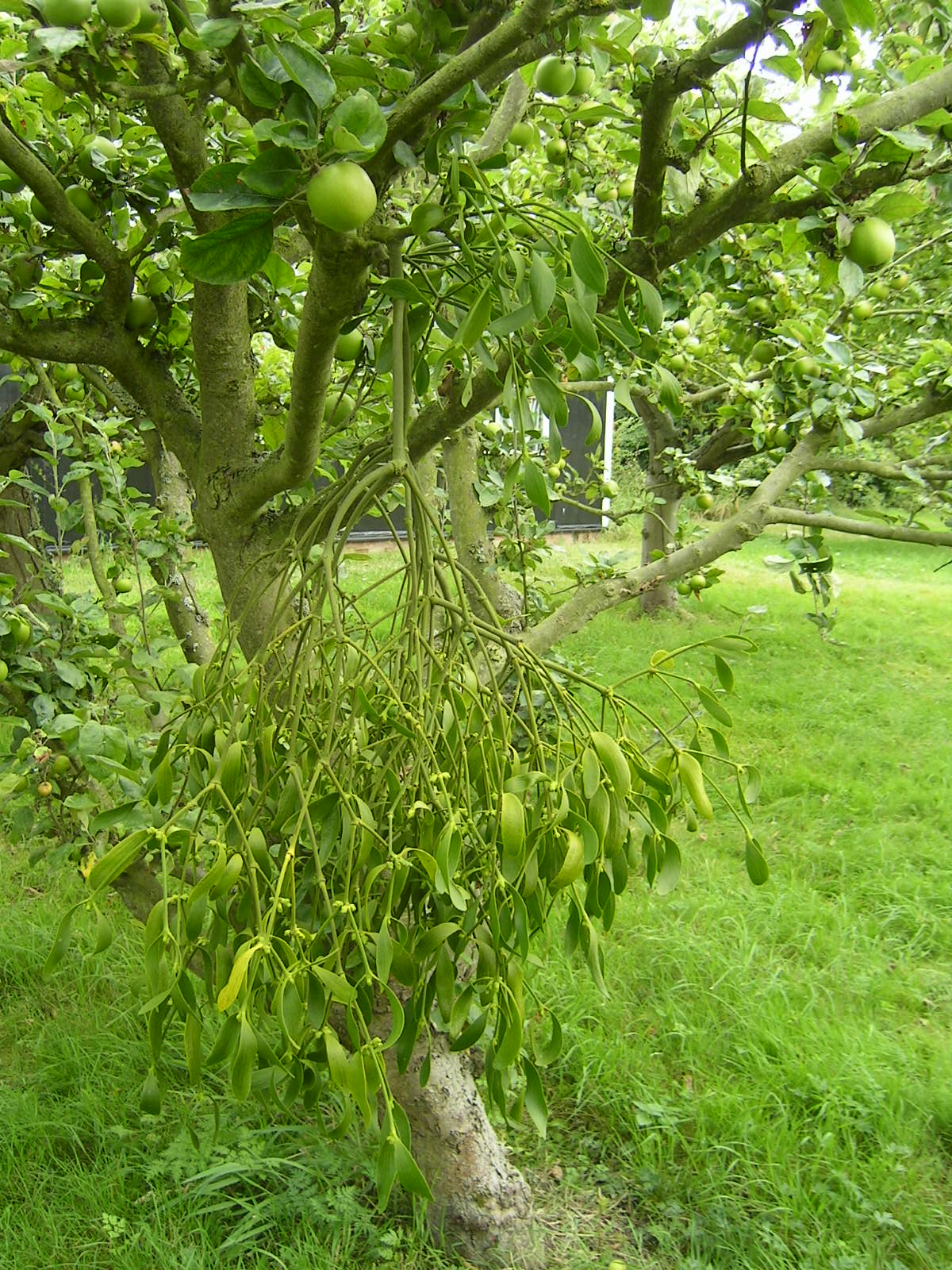
On an apple tree in Essex, England

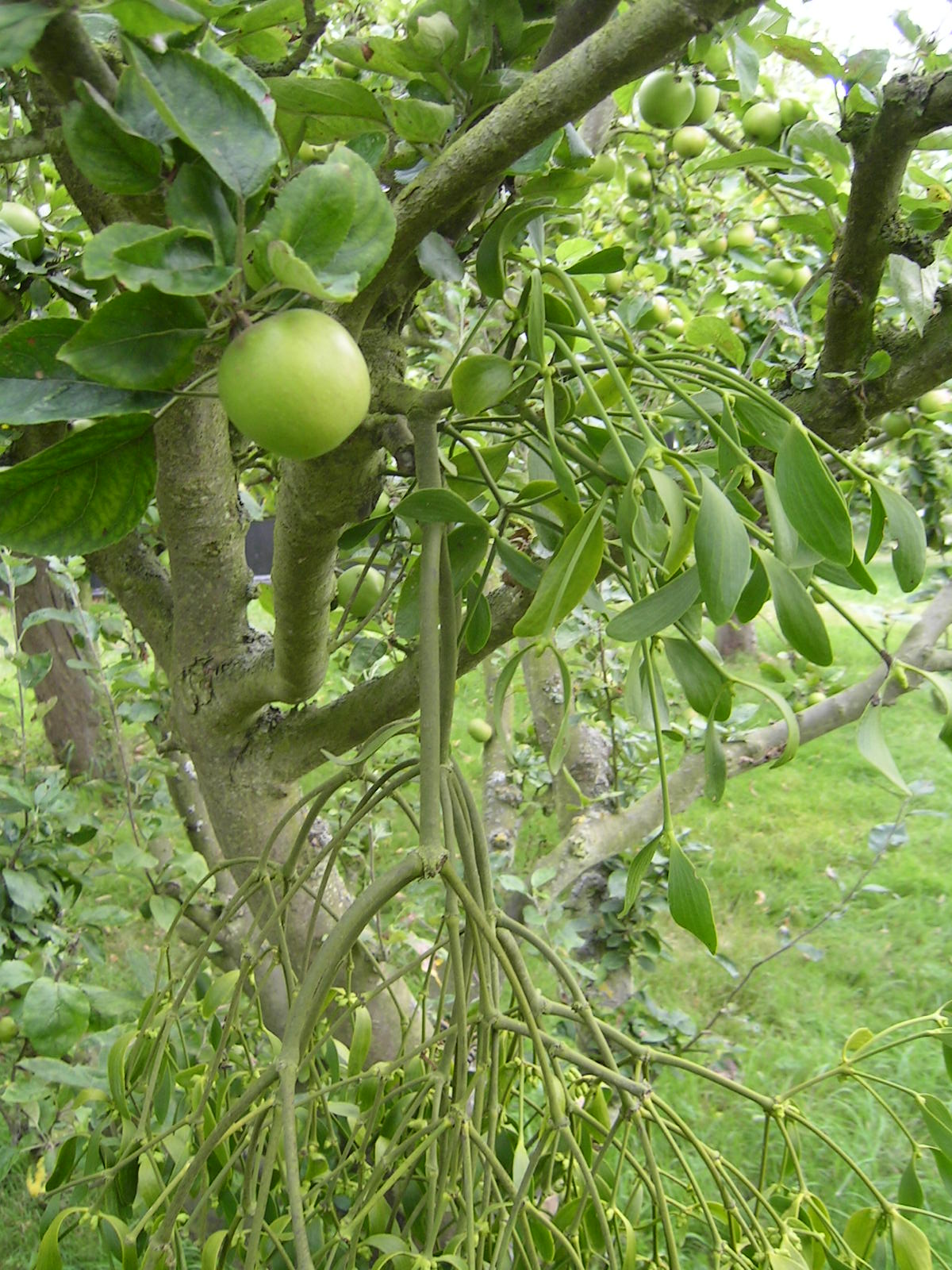
On an apple tree in Essex, England

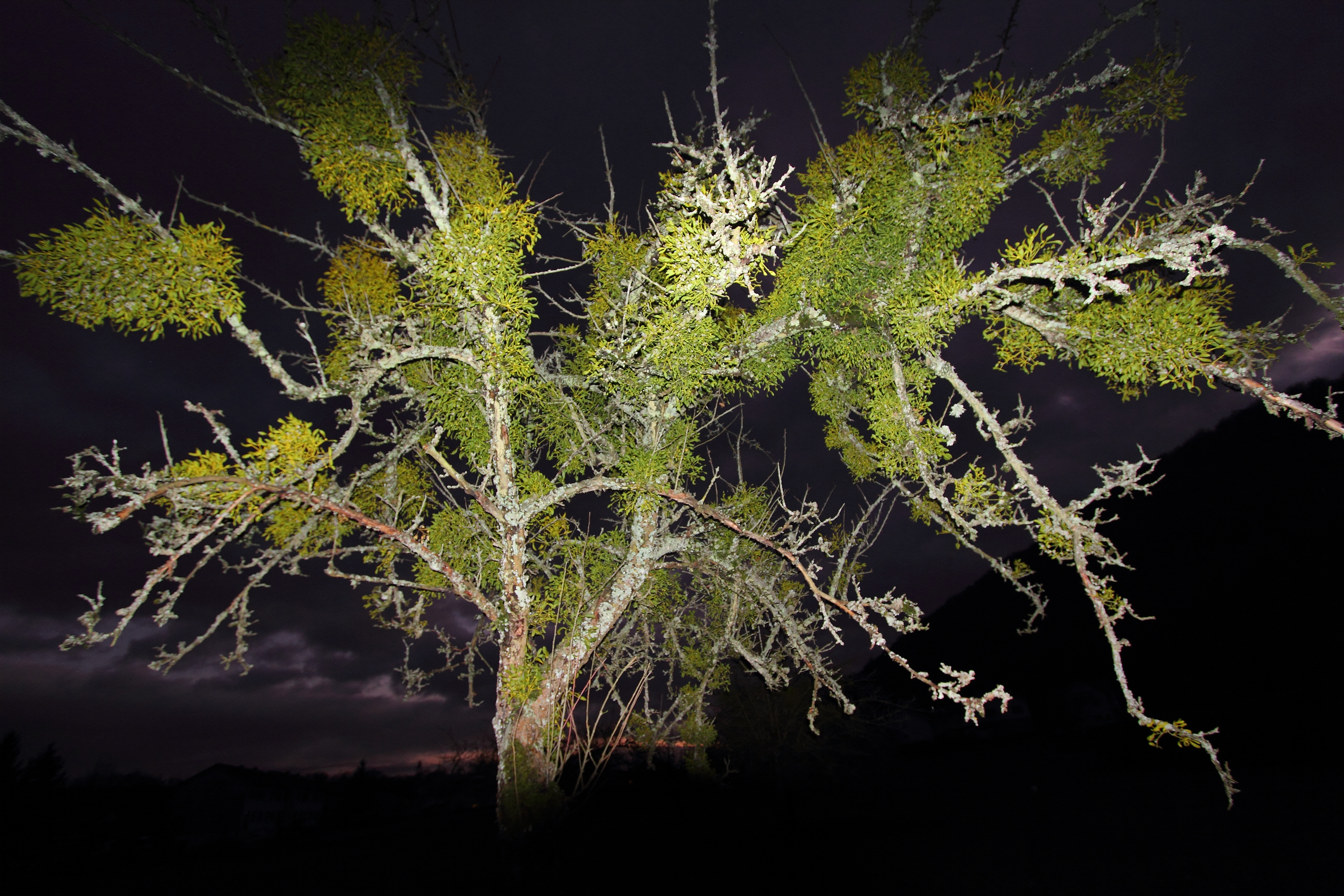
In abundance on an apple tree (in Franche-Comté)

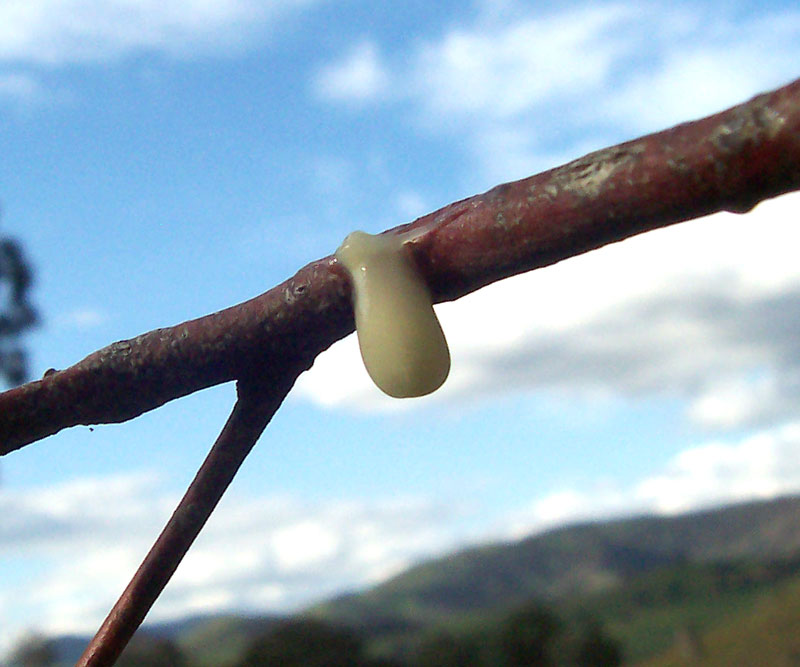
Sticky seed on a branch

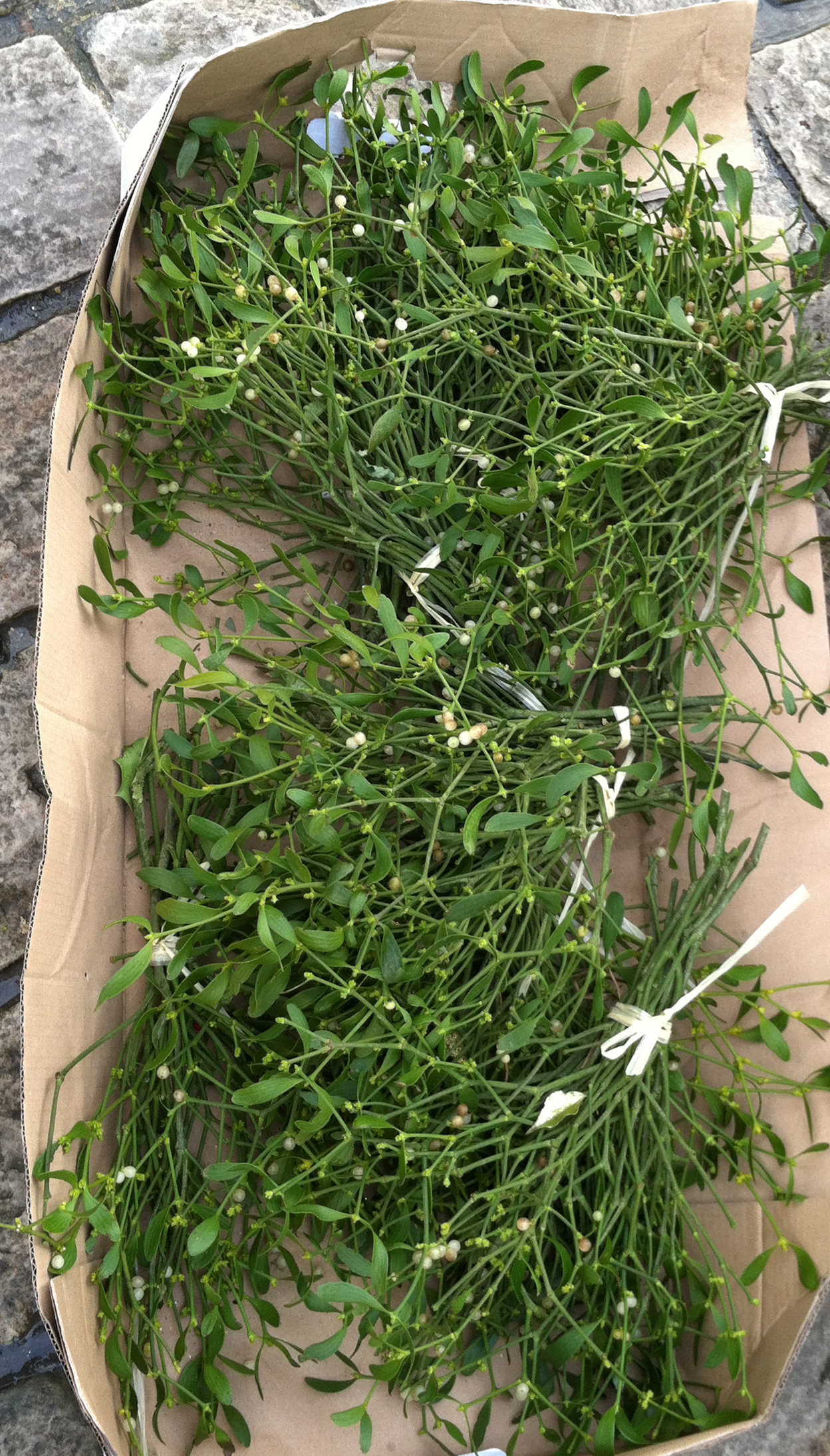
In Versailles, France

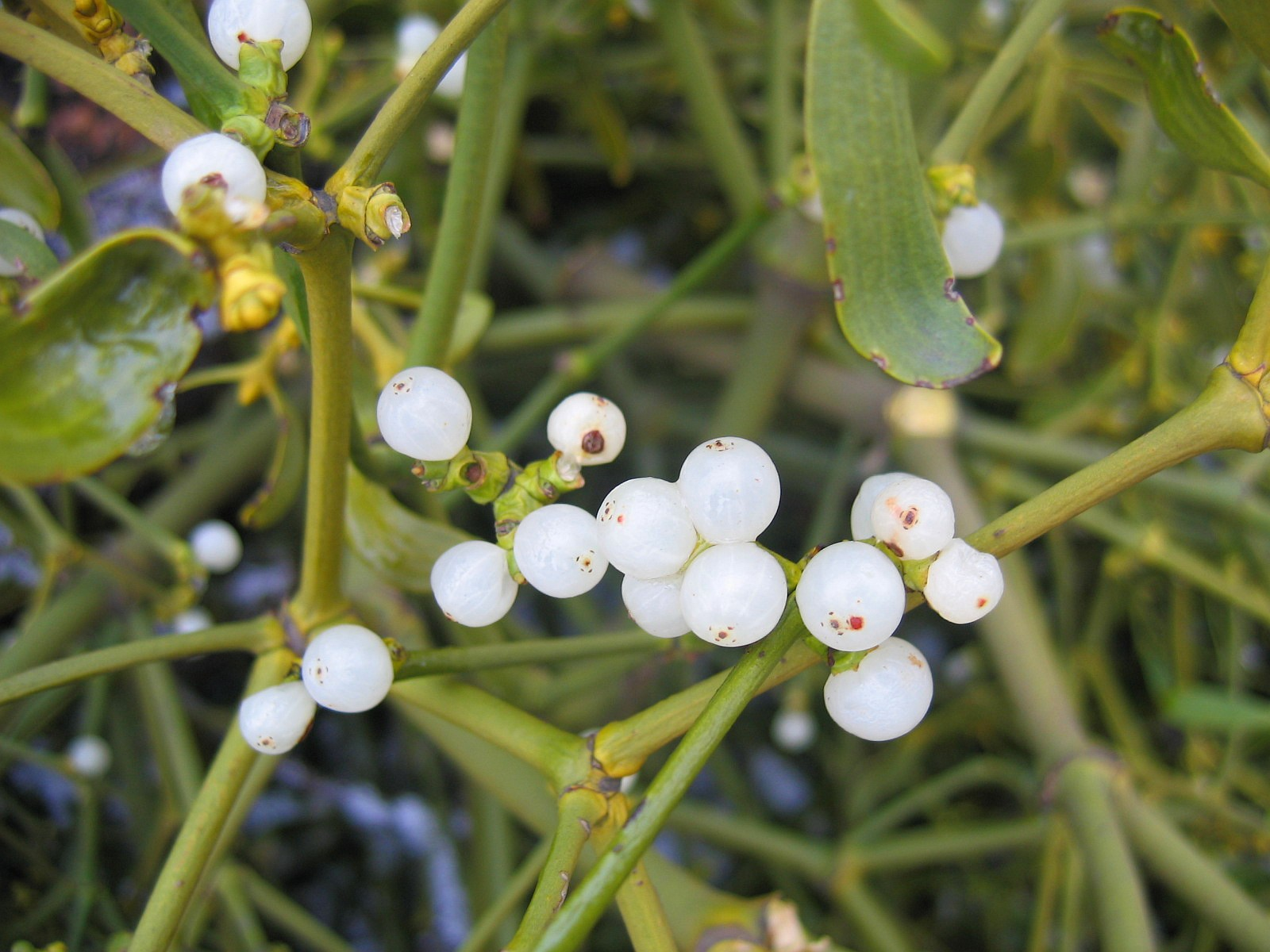
Fruit of V. a. album, in Poland

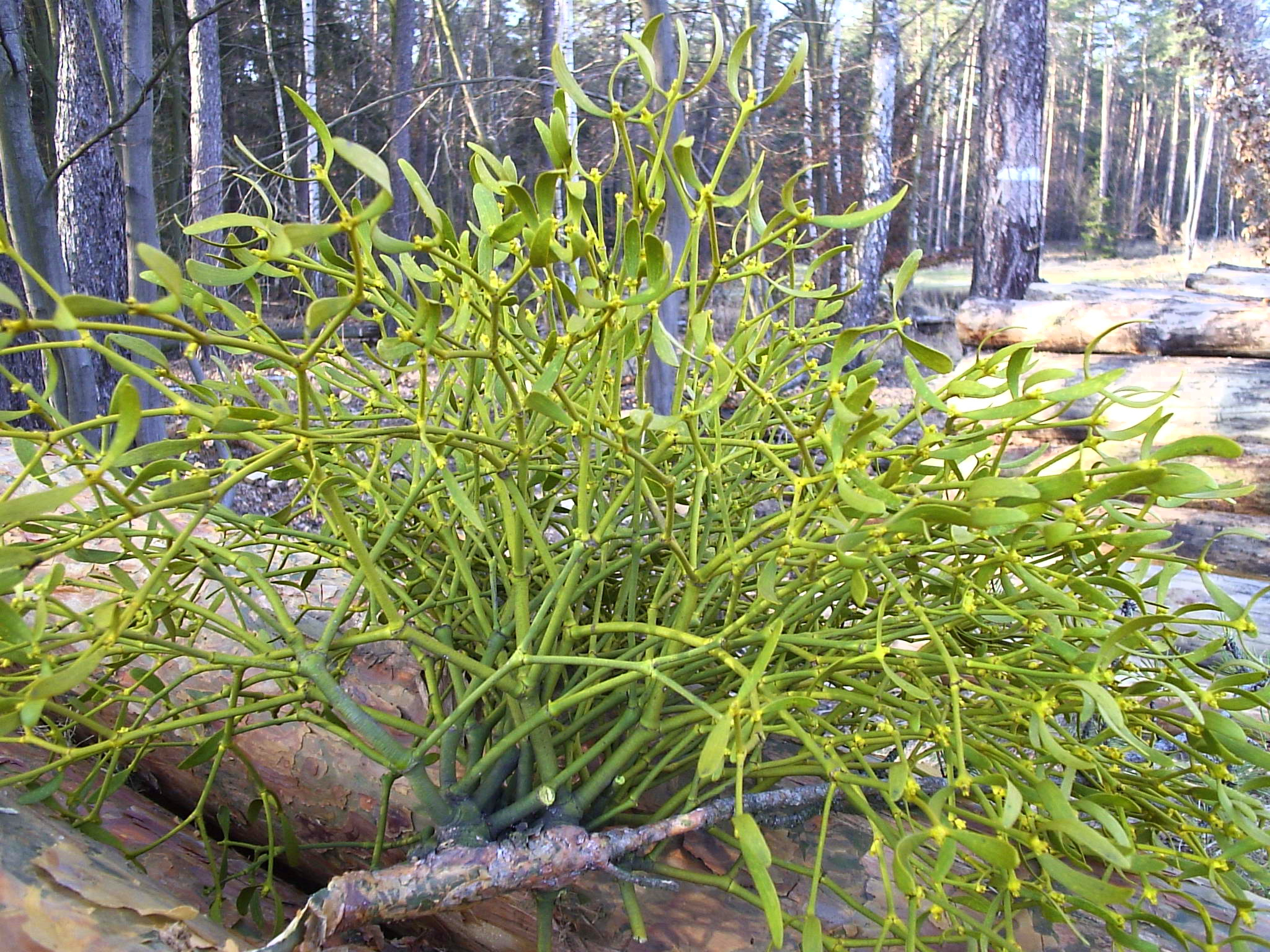
V. a. austriacum on Pinus sylvestris, Poland

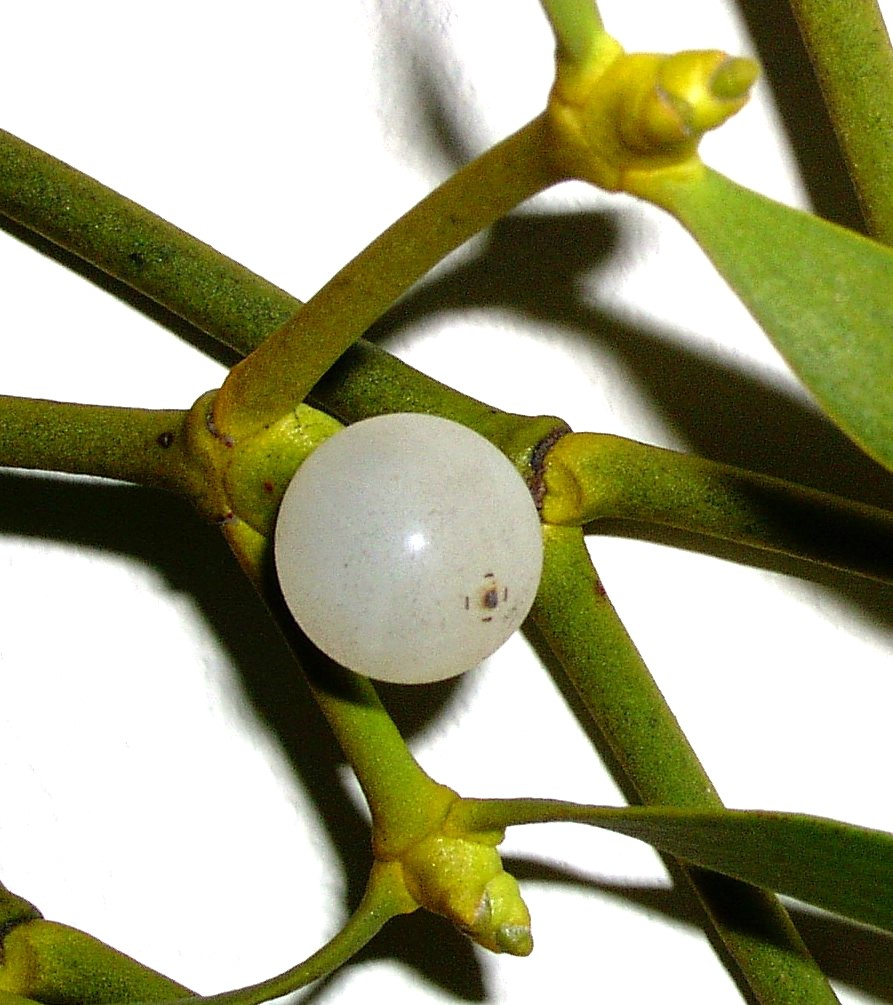
Fruit, in Gryfino, NW Poland

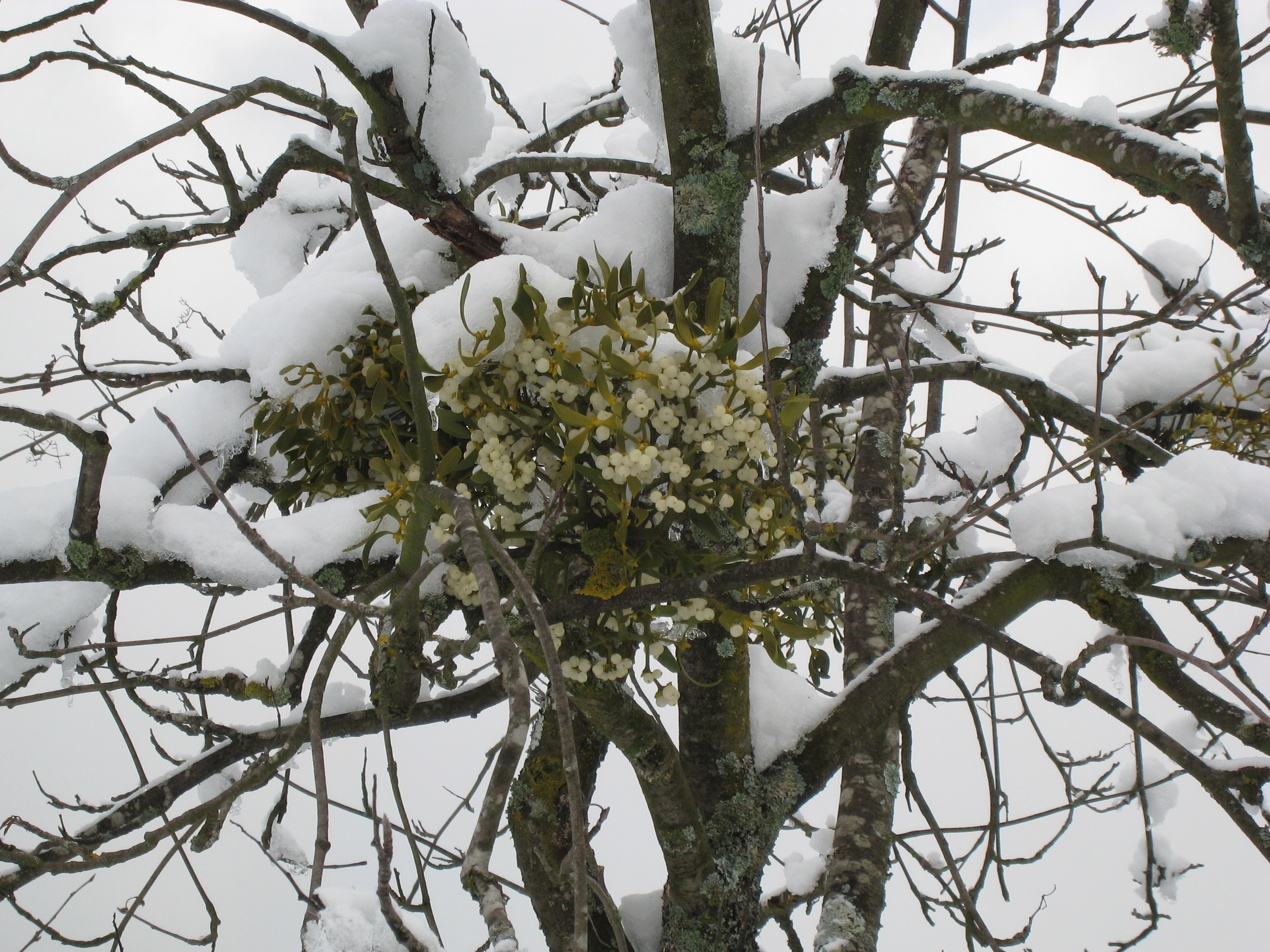
Viscum album in France, winter

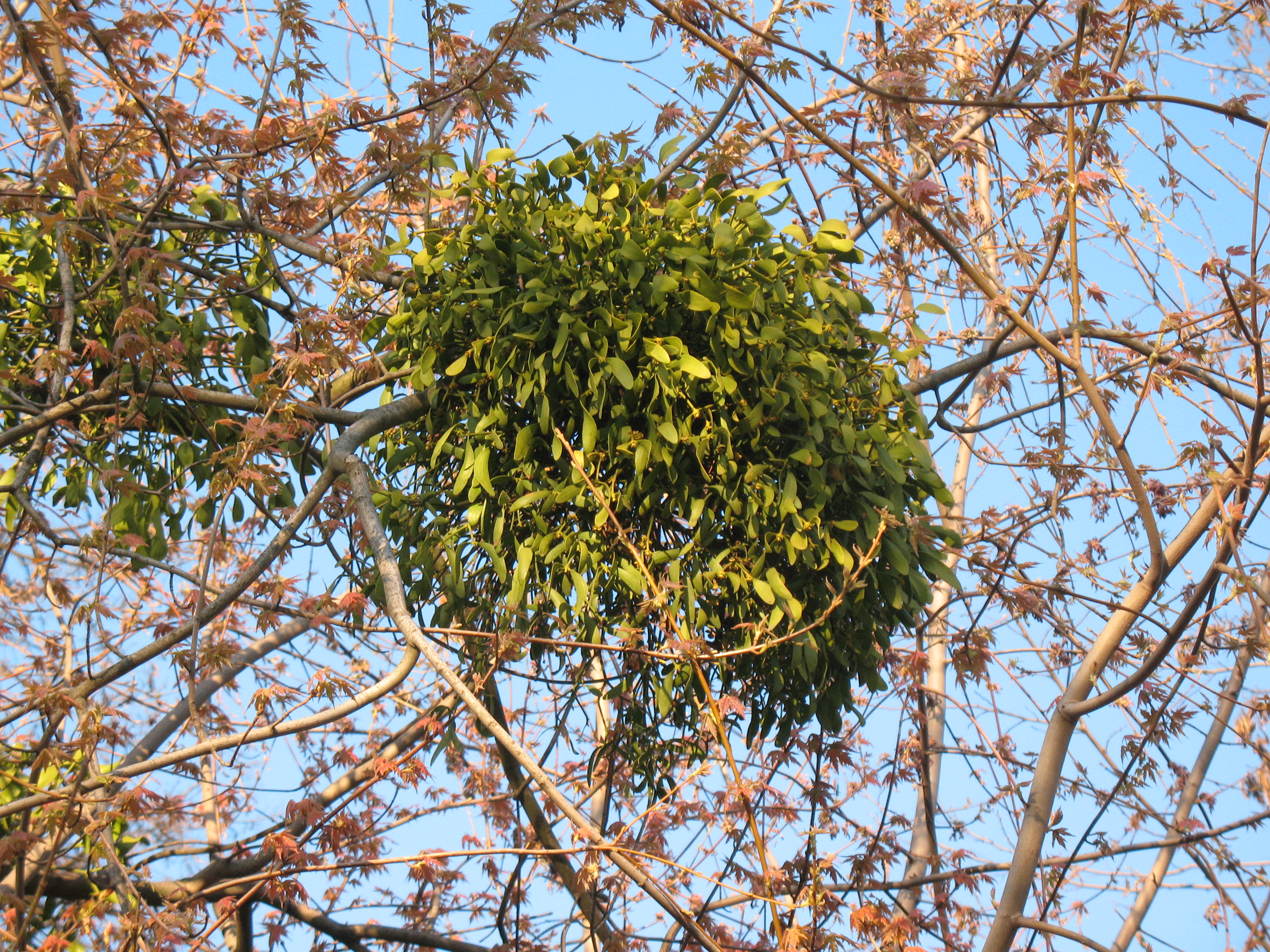
Viscum album in Ukraine, spring

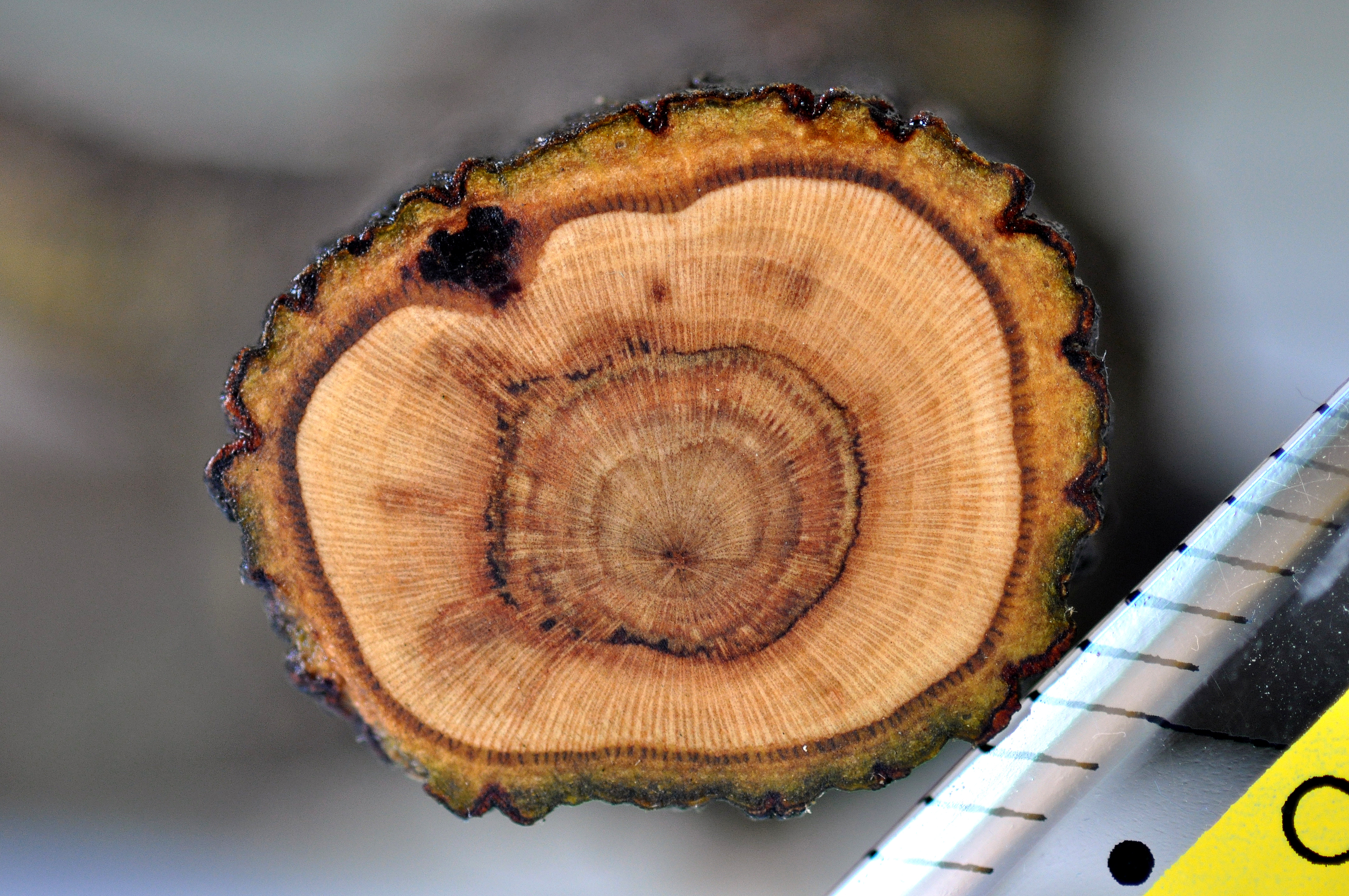
Cross section of wood

== See also ==
- Christmas decoration
- List of unproven and disproven cancer treatments
