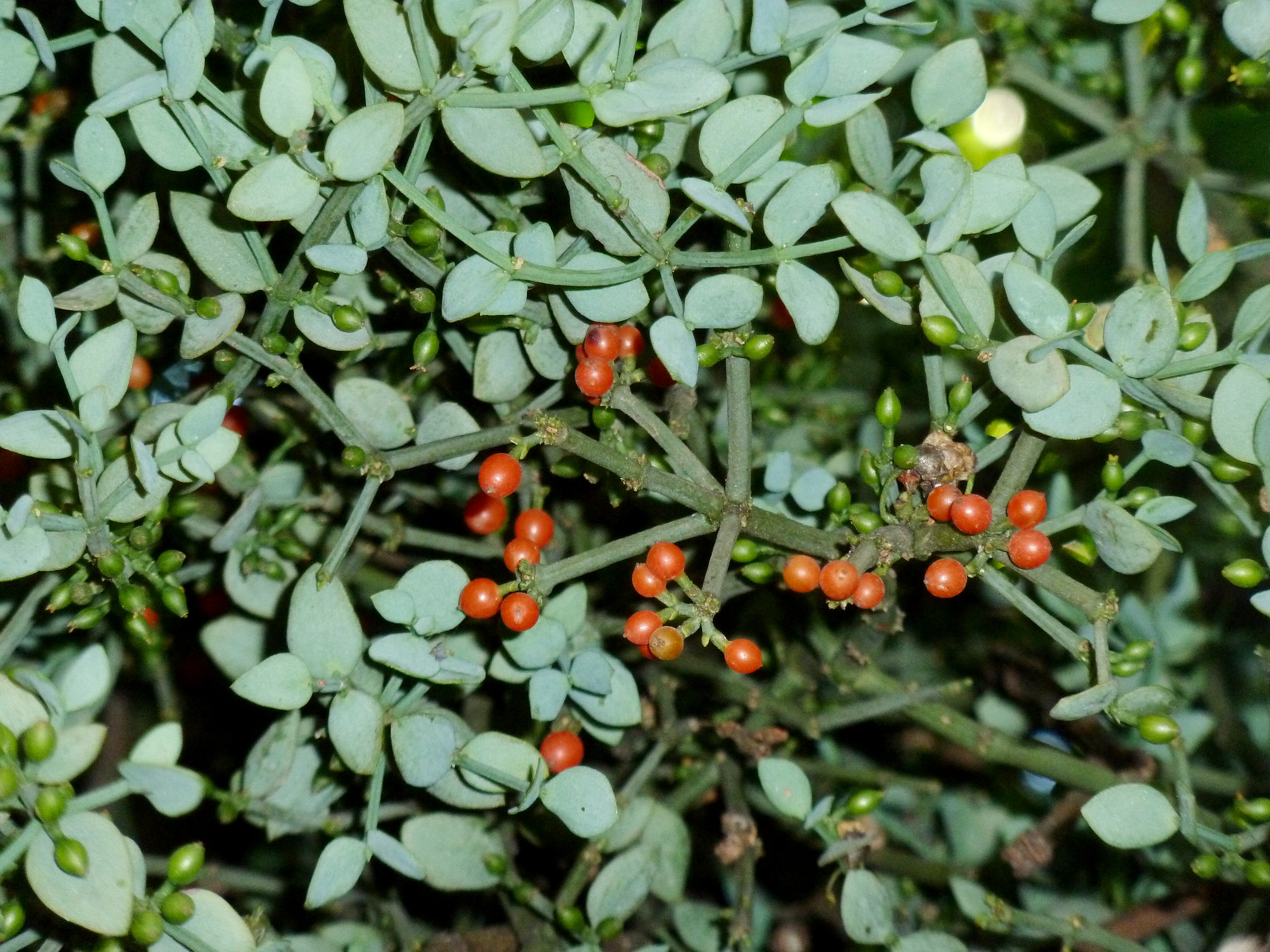

Scientific classification
- Kingdom: Plantae
- Clade: Tracheophytes
- Clade: Angiosperms
- Clade: Eudicots
- Order: Santalales
- Family: Santalaceae
- Genus: Viscum
- Species: V. rotundifolium

Binomial name
- Viscum rotundifolium L.f.

Synonyms
- Viscum bosciae-foetidae Dinter; Viscum glaucum Eckl. & Zeyh.; Viscum macowanii Engl.; Viscum thymifolium C.Presl; Viscum tricostatum E.Mey.; Viscum ziziphi-mucronati Dinter

= Viscum rotundifolium =

Species of flowering plant

Viscum rotundifolium, the red-berry mistletoe, is a variable, wide-ranging and monoecious mistletoe of southern Africa. It is a hardy, evergreen hemiparasite with a catholic variety of host plants, including other mistletoes. It may be found from near sea level to 1,950 m. Its fleshy, leathery leaves are dark or pale green and variable in shape, though usually broadly ovate to elliptic. While its creamy-green flowers are small and inconspicuous, the fruit are a brilliant, shiny orange-red colour when ripe. It is similar to V. schaeferi Engl. & K.Krause and V. pauciflorum L.f. with which it may be confused.
