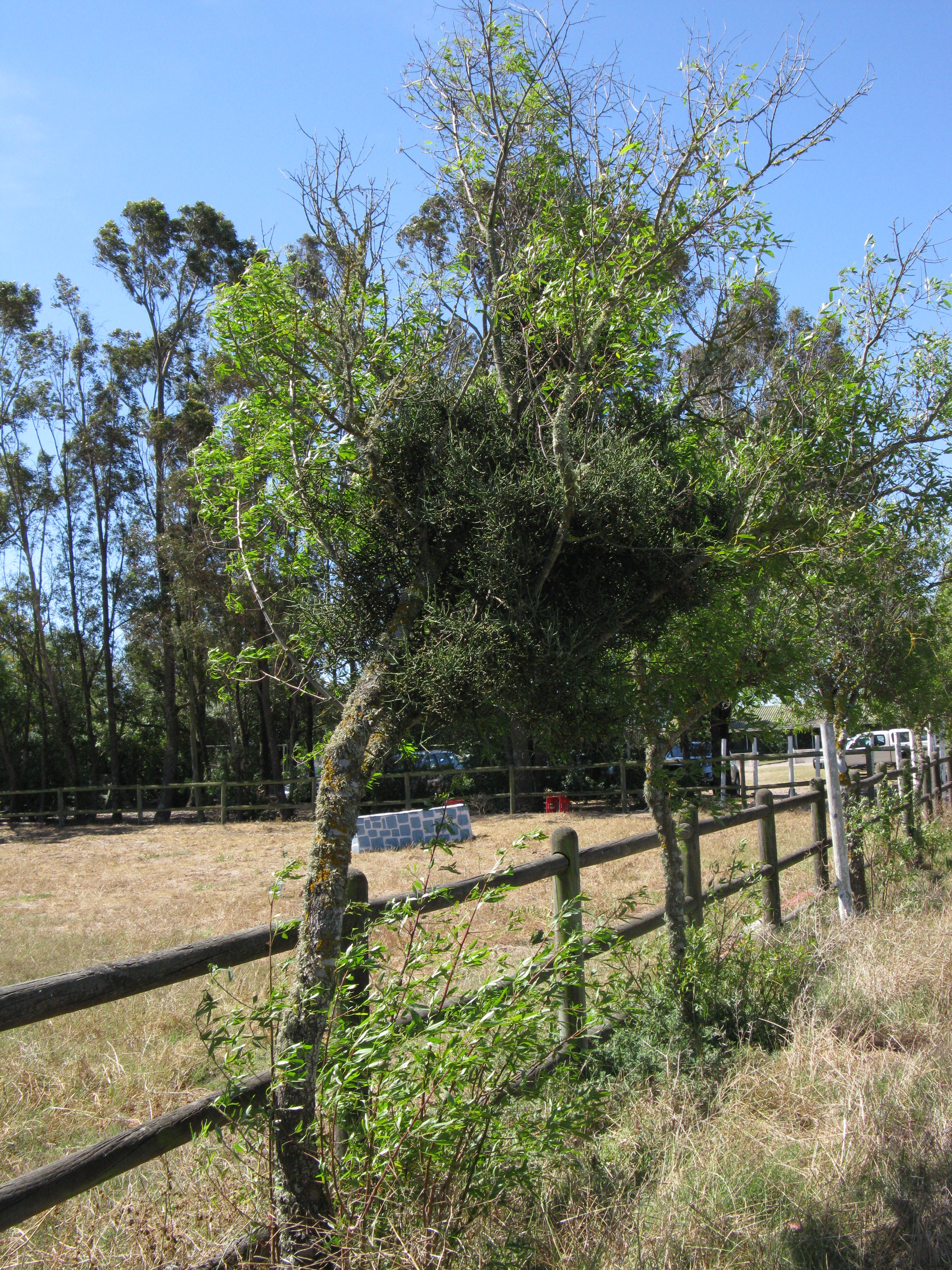
- Viscum capense showing its tangled habit in a typical host tree

Scientific classification
- Kingdom: Plantae
- Clade: Tracheophytes
- Clade: Angiosperms
- Clade: Eudicots
- Order: Santalales
- Family: Santalaceae
- Genus: Viscum
- Species: V. capense

Binomial name
- Viscum capense L.f.

= Viscum capense =

Species of flowering plant

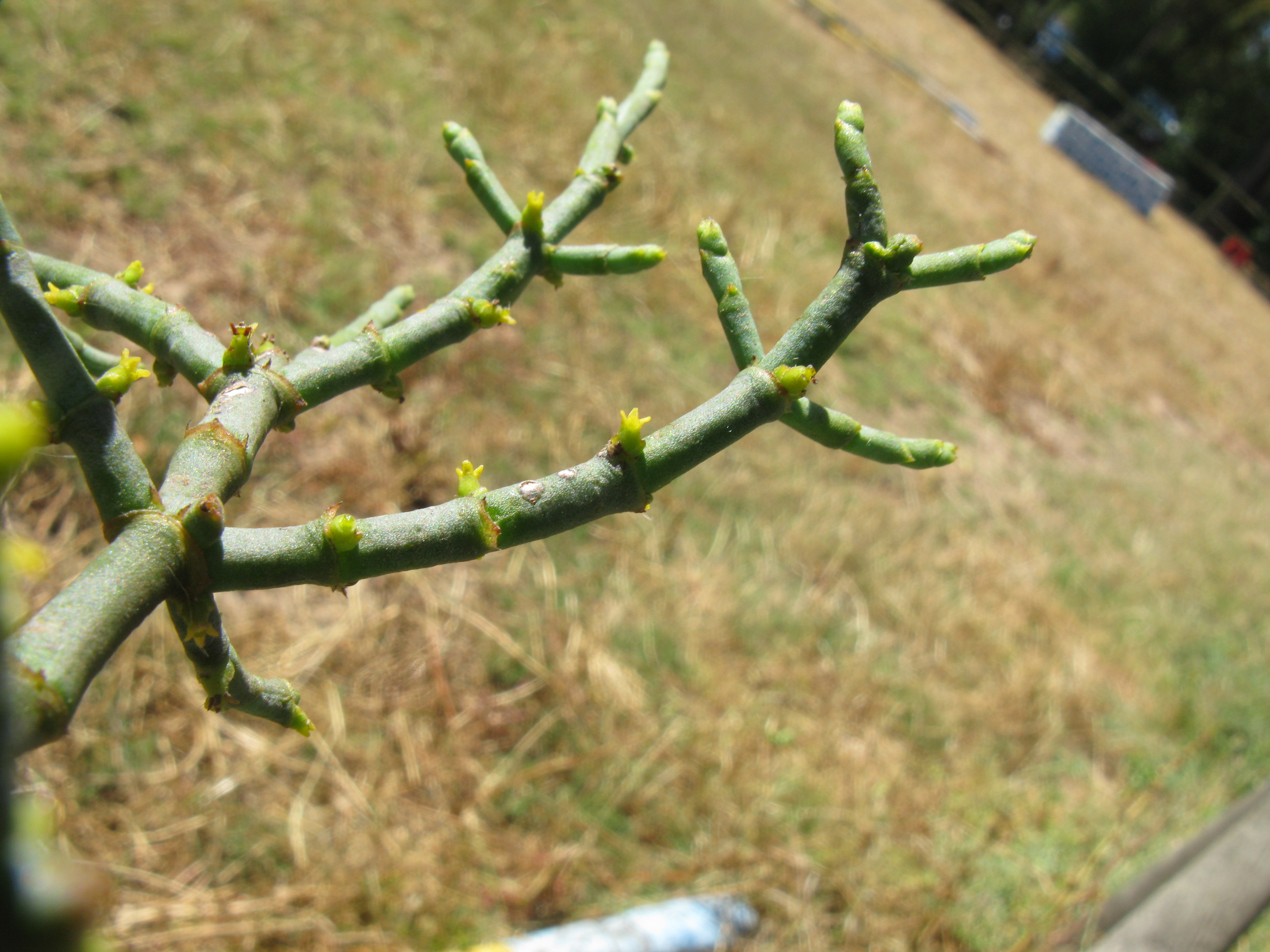
Viscum capense has an angled mode of branching that causes its tangled growth habit. The result is ecologically important because it offers shelter to various organisms. As shown here, the flowers are greenish yellow

Viscum capense (common name, Cape mistletoe) is a species of Mistletoe that is indigenous to South Africa, especially the area from Cape Town, northwards along the coast up to Namibia, and eastwards as far as the Eastern Cape province.

This parasitic plant has jointed stems, vestigial leaves in the form of small scales around the stem nodes, and tiny yellowish-green flowers that produce translucent pale berries. The fruit is dispersed by birds. The plant is poisonous but is nonetheless used in traditional African medicine, the plant being boiled to make a tea that is used to soothe asthma. It is dioecious, with male and female flowers on separate plants.
