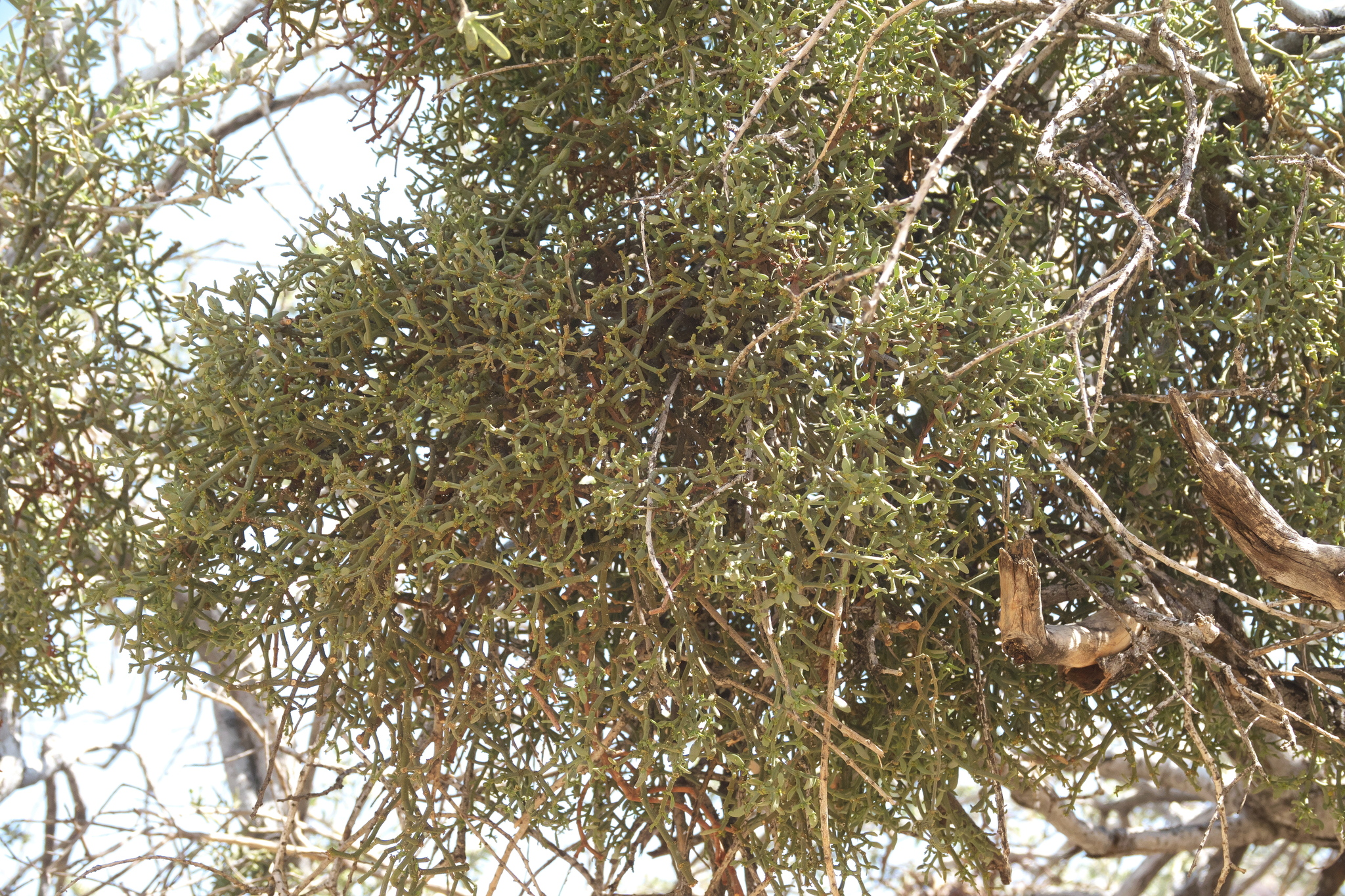
- Viscum schaeferi, nama mistletoe, Namibia

Scientific classification
- Kingdom: Plantae
- Clade: Tracheophytes
- Clade: Angiosperms
- Clade: Eudicots
- Order: Santalales
- Family: Santalaceae
- Genus: Viscum
- Species: V. schaeferi

Binomial name
- Viscum schaeferi Engl. & K.Krause

= Viscum schaeferi =

Species of plant

Viscum schaeferi, the nama mistletoe, is a species of mistletoe in the family Santalaceae. Like other mistletoes, it is hemiparasitic and draws nutrients and moisture from its host tree.

The leaves of this plant are thick and leathery, 1 to 4 cm. in length. It has green, succulent limbs. Its flowers bloom in yellowish-green clusters, and the berries are small and viscous.

Nama mistletoe flourishes in arid and semi-arid regions, especially in the savannas and woodlands of South Africa, Namibia, and Botswana.

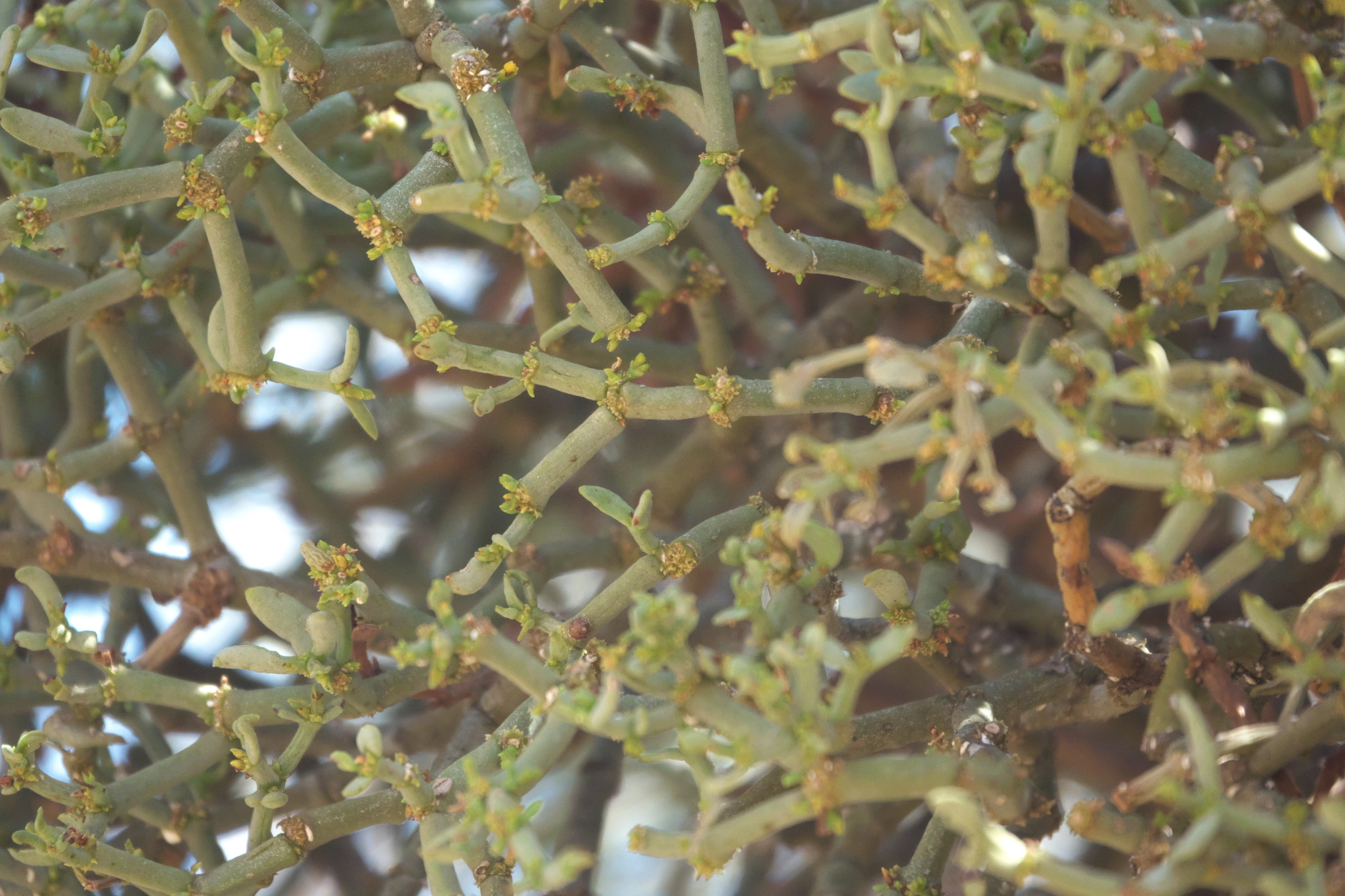
Viscum schaeferi, nama mistletoe, Namibia
