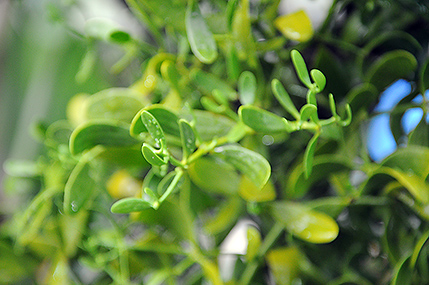

Scientific classification
- Kingdom: Plantae
- Clade: Embryophytes
- Clade: Tracheophytes
- Clade: Angiosperms
- Clade: Eudicots
- Order: Santalales
- Family: Santalaceae
- Genus: Viscum
- Species: V. cruciatum

Binomial name
- Viscum cruciatum Sieber ex Boiss.

= Viscum cruciatum =

Species of flowering plant

Viscum cruciatum, commonly called the red-berry mistletoe, is a species of mistletoe in the family Santalaceae. It is native to Lebanon, Morocco, Israel, Palestine, Portugal, Spain, and Syria.

The plant has small leaves. The flowers have four petals. The berries are red containing one seed. All parts of the plants are poisonous if eaten. Its fruit is harmless to birds which disperse the seeds. It is used as a Christmas decoration.

== Gallery ==
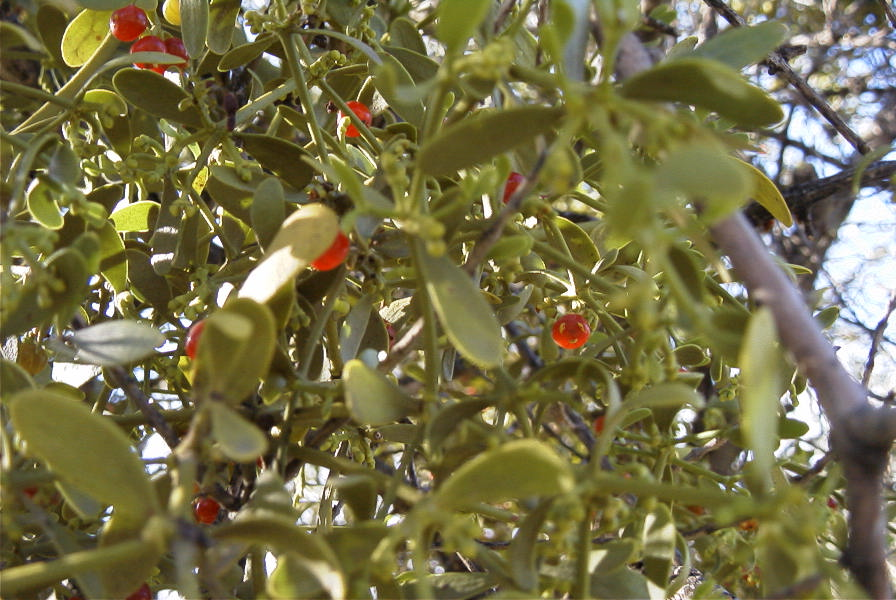
Viscum cruciatum
