= Mistletoe =

Common name for various parasitic plants

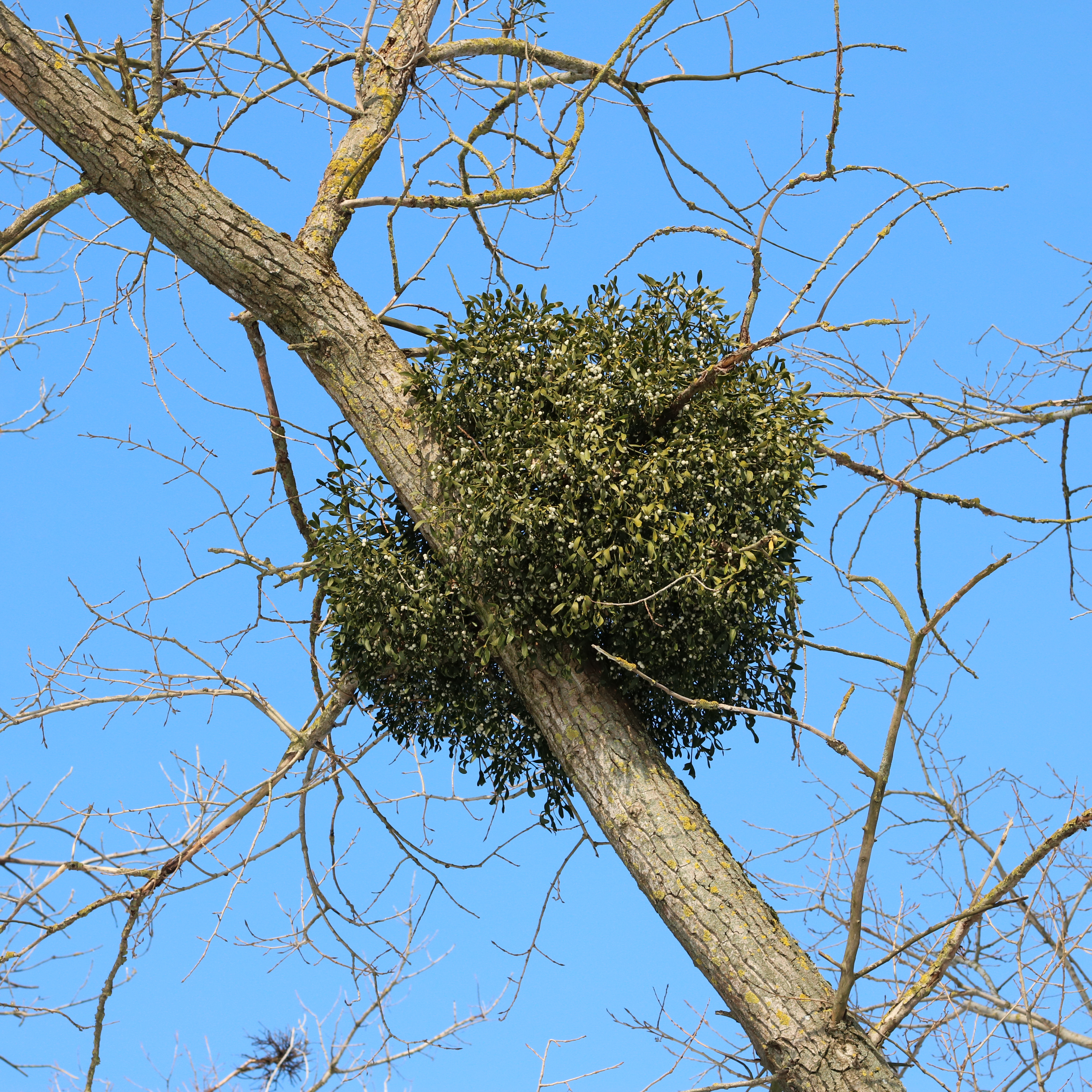
European mistletoe (Viscum album) attached to a dormant common aspen (Populus tremula)

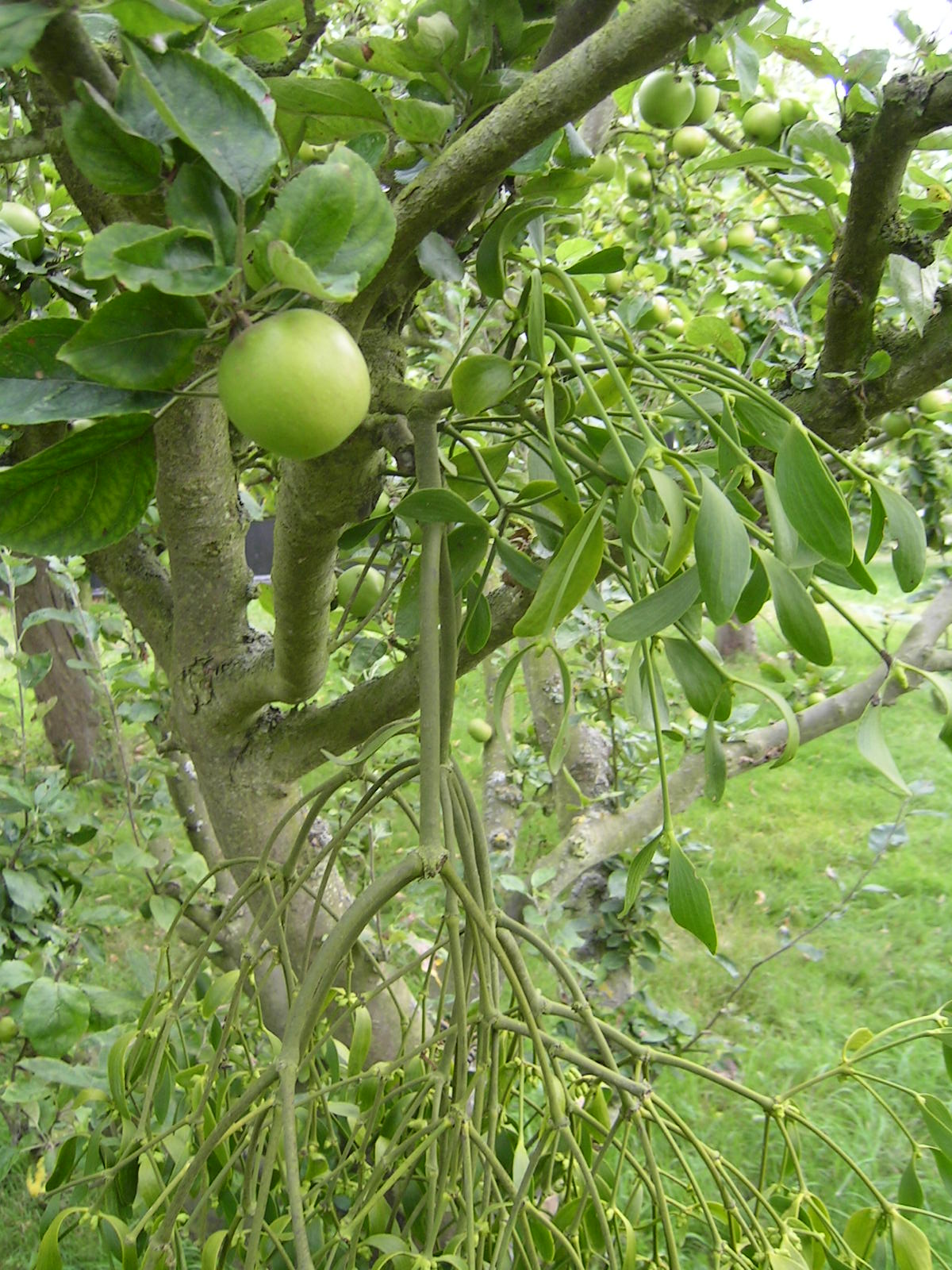
European mistletoe growing on an apple tree (Malus domestica); despite the mistletoe's presence, the apple tree is still able to bear fruit.

Mistletoe is the common name for obligate hemiparasitic plants in the order Santalales. They are attached to their host tree or shrub by a structure called the haustorium, through which they extract water and nutrients from the host plant. There are hundreds of species which mostly live in tropical regions.

The name mistletoe originally referred to the species Viscum album (European mistletoe, of the family Santalaceae in the order Santalales); it is the only species native to the British Isles and much of Europe. A related species with red fruits, rather than white, Viscum cruciatum, occurs in Southwest Spain and Southern Portugal, as well as in Morocco in North Africa and in southern Africa. There is also a wide variety of species in Australia. The genus Viscum is not native to North America, but Viscum album was introduced to Northern California in 1900.

The eastern mistletoe native to North America, Phoradendron leucarpum, belongs to a distinct genus of the family Santalaceae.

European mistletoe has smooth-edged, oval, evergreen leaves borne in pairs along the woody stem, and waxy, white berries that it bears in clusters of two to six. The eastern mistletoe of North America is similar, but has shorter, broader leaves and longer clusters of ten or more berries.

Over the centuries, the term mistletoe has been broadened to include many other species of parasitic plants with similar habits, found in other parts of the world, that are classified in different genera and families such as the Misodendraceae of South America and the mainly southern hemisphere tropical Loranthaceae.

== Etymology ==
The word 'mistletoe' derives from the older form 'mistle' adding the Old English word tān (twig). 'Mistle' is from Common Germanic (cf. Old High German mistil, Middle High German mistel, Old English mistel, Old Norse mistil). Further etymology is uncertain, but may be related to the Germanic base for 'mash'.

Online Etymology Dictionary offers a similar theory, noting, "The alteration of the ending... is perhaps from a mistaking of the final -n for a plural suffix after tan fell from use as a separate word, but Oxford finds it a natural evolution in West Saxon based on stress."

== Groups ==
Parasitism has evolved at least twelve times among the vascular plants. Molecular data show the mistletoe habit has evolved independently five times within the Santalales—first in the Misodendraceae, but also in the Loranthaceae and three times in the Santalaceae (in the former Santalalean families Eremolepidaceae and Viscaceae, and the tribe Amphorogyneae).

The largest family of mistletoes, the Loranthaceae, has 73 genera and more than 900 species. Subtropical and tropical climates have markedly more mistletoe species; Australia has 85, of which 71 are in Loranthaceae, and 14 in Santalaceae.

== Life cycle ==
Mistletoe species grow on a wide range of host trees, some of which experience side effects including reduced growth, stunting, and loss of infested outer branches. A heavy infestation may also kill the host plant. Viscum album successfully parasitizes more than 200 tree and shrub species.

All mistletoe species are hemiparasites because they do perform some photosynthesis for some period of their life cycle. However, in some species its contribution is very nearly zero. For example, some species, such as Viscum minimum, that parasitize succulents, commonly species of Cactaceae or Euphorbiaceae, grow largely within the host plant, with hardly more than the flower and fruit emerging. Once they have germinated and attached to the circulatory system of the host, their photosynthesis reduces so much that it becomes insignificant.

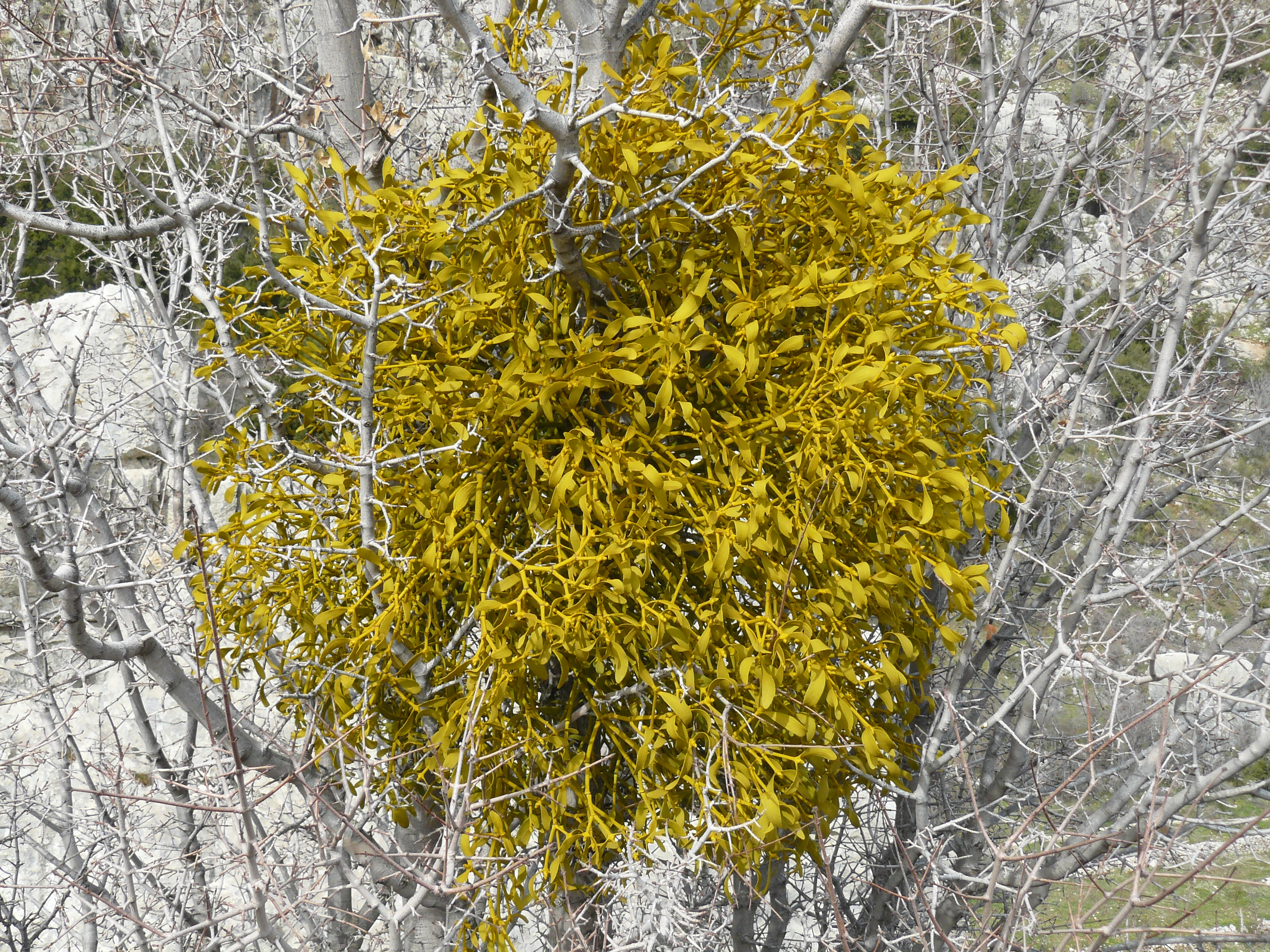
Mistletoe in winter

Most of the Viscaceae bear evergreen leaves that photosynthesise effectively, and photosynthesis proceeds within their green, fleshy stems as well. Some species, such as Viscum capense, are adapted to semi-arid conditions and their leaves are vestigial scales, hardly visible without detailed investigation. Therefore, their photosynthesis and transpiration only take place in their stems, limiting their demands on the water supply of their host, but also limiting their intake of carbon dioxide for photosynthesis. Accordingly, their contribution to the metabolic balance of their host becomes trivial and the idle parasite may become quite yellow or golden as it grows, having practically given up photosynthesis.

At another extreme, other species have vigorous green leaves. Not only do they photosynthesize actively, but a heavy infestation of mistletoe plants may take over whole host tree branches, sometimes killing practically the entire crown and replacing it with their own growth. In such a tree the host is relegated purely to the supply of water and mineral nutrients and the physical support of the trunk. Such a tree may survive as a Viscum community for years; it resembles a totally unknown species unless one examines it closely, because its foliage does not look like that of any tree. An example of a species that behaves in this manner is Viscum continuum.

A mistletoe seed germinates on the branch of a host tree or shrub, and in its early stages of development it is independent of its host. It commonly has two or even four embryos, each producing its hypocotyl, that grows toward the bark of the host under the influence of light and gravity, and potentially each forming a mistletoe plant in a clump. Possibly as an adaptation to assist in guiding the process of growing away from the light, the adhesive on the seed tends to darken the bark. On having made contact with the bark, the hypocotyl, with only a rudimentary scrap of root tissue at its tip, penetrates it, a process that may take a year or more. In the meantime the plant is dependent on its own photosynthesis. Only after it reaches the host's conductive tissue may it begin to rely on the host for its needs. Later, it forms a haustorium that penetrates the host tissue and takes water and nutrients from the host plant.

Species more or less obligate include the leafless quintral, Tristerix aphyllus, which lives deep inside the sugar-transporting tissue of a spiny cactus, appearing only to show its tubular red flowers, and the genus Arceuthobium (dwarf mistletoe; Santalaceae) that has reduced photosynthesis; as an adult, it manufactures only a small proportion of the sugars it needs from its own photosynthesis, but as a seedling actively photosynthesizes until a connection to the host is established.

Some species of the largest family, Loranthaceae, have small, insect-pollinated flowers (as with Santalaceae), but others have spectacularly showy, large, bird-pollinated flowers.

Most mistletoe seeds are spread by birds who eat the 'seeds' (in actuality drupes). Of the many bird species that feed on them, the mistle thrush is the best-known in Europe, the phainopepla in southwestern North America, and Dicaeum flowerpeckers in Asia and Australia. Depending on the species of mistletoe and the species of bird, the seeds are regurgitated from the crop, excreted in their droppings, or stuck to the bill and causing the bird to have to wipe it off onto a branch. The seeds are coated with a sticky material called viscin. Some viscin remains on the seed and when it touches a stem, it sticks tenaciously. The viscin soon hardens and attaches the seed firmly to its future host, where it germinates and its haustorium penetrates the sound bark.

Specialist mistletoe eaters have adaptations that expedite the process; some pass the seeds through their unusually shaped digestive tracts so fast that a pause for defecation of the seeds is part of the feeding routine. Others have adapted patterns of feeding behavior; the bird grips the fruit in its bill and squeezes the sticky-coated seed out to the side. The seed sticks to the beak and the bird wipes it off onto the branch and consumes the remainder of the fruit. An example of a bird with this adapted method is the blackcap (Sylvia atricapilla).

Biochemically, viscin is a complex adhesive mix containing cellulosic strands and mucopolysaccharides.

Once a mistletoe plant is established on its host, it usually is possible to save a valuable branch by pruning and judicious removal of the wood invaded by the haustorium, if the infection is caught early enough. Some species of mistletoe can regenerate if the pruning leaves any of the haustorium alive in the wood.

== Toxicity ==
There are 1500 species of mistletoe, varying widely in toxicity to humans; the European mistletoe (Viscum album) is more toxic than the American mistletoe (Phoradendron serotinum).

The primary active toxic compounds in American mistletoe are phoratoxins (in Phoradendron) and their effects can include blurred vision, diarrhea, nausea, and vomiting, although these rarely occur. Their primary mechanism of action is through disruption of cell membranes which causes lysis and cell death at high concentrations.

In European mistletoe (Viscum), viscumin is the more dangerous active toxin. It acts by irreversibly inhibiting ribsomal protein synthesis in cells, which leads to the death of the affected cell, tissue damage in the area of exposure from mass cell death in the very short term, with the potential for organ failure and death depending on the level of exposure. Early symptoms depend mostly on the route of exposure as the first cells it contacts (thus the first to have their protein synthesis deactivated by it) will be the first to die. Its toxic effects take place through the same mechanism as ricin and other ribosome-inactivating proteins but it enters the cells by a different mechanism than ricin and is toxic even to cultured ricin-resistant cells.

Mistletoe has been used historically in medicine for its supposed value in treating arthritis, high blood pressure, epilepsy, and infertility.

== Ecological importance ==
Mistletoes are often considered pests that kill trees and devalue natural habitats, but some species have recently been recognized as ecological keystone species, organisms that have a disproportionately pervasive influence over their community. A broad array of animals depend on mistletoe for food, consuming the leaves and young shoots, transferring pollen between plants and dispersing the sticky seeds. In western North America their juicy berries are eaten and spread by birds (notably the phainopepla) while in Australia the mistletoebird behaves similarly. When eaten with the fruit, some seeds pass unharmed through their digestive systems, emerging in extremely sticky droppings which the bird deposits on tree branches, where some may stick long enough to germinate. As the plants mature, they grow into masses of branching stems that suggest the popular name "witches' brooms".

The dense evergreen witches' brooms formed by the dwarf mistletoes (Arceuthobium species) of western North America also make excellent locations for roosting and nesting of the northern spotted owl and the marbled murrelet. In Australia the diamond firetail and painted honeyeater are recorded as nesting in different mistletoes.

A study of mistletoe in junipers concluded that more juniper berries sprout in stands where mistletoe is present, as the mistletoe attracts berry-eating birds who also eat juniper berries.

== Cultural importance ==
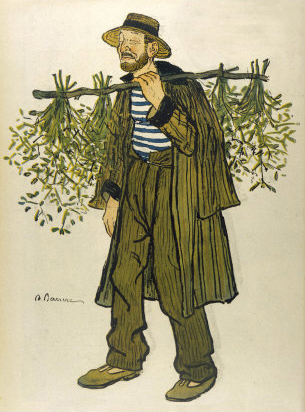
The Mistletoe Seller by Adrien Barrère

Mistletoe is relevant to several cultures. Pagan cultures regarded the white berries as symbols of male fertility, with the seeds resembling semen. The Celts, particularly, saw mistletoe as the semen of Taranis, while the Ancient Greeks referred to mistletoe as "oak sperm". Also in Roman mythology, mistletoe was used by the hero Aeneas to reach the underworld.

Mistletoe may have played an important role in Druidic mythology in the Ritual of Oak and Mistletoe, although the only ancient writer to mention the use of mistletoe in this ceremony was Pliny the Elder. Evidence taken from bog bodies makes the Celtic use of mistletoe seem medicinal rather than ritual. It is possible that mistletoe was originally associated with human sacrifice and only became associated with the white bull after the Romans banned human sacrifices.

The Romans associated mistletoe with peace, love, and understanding and hung it over doorways to protect the household.

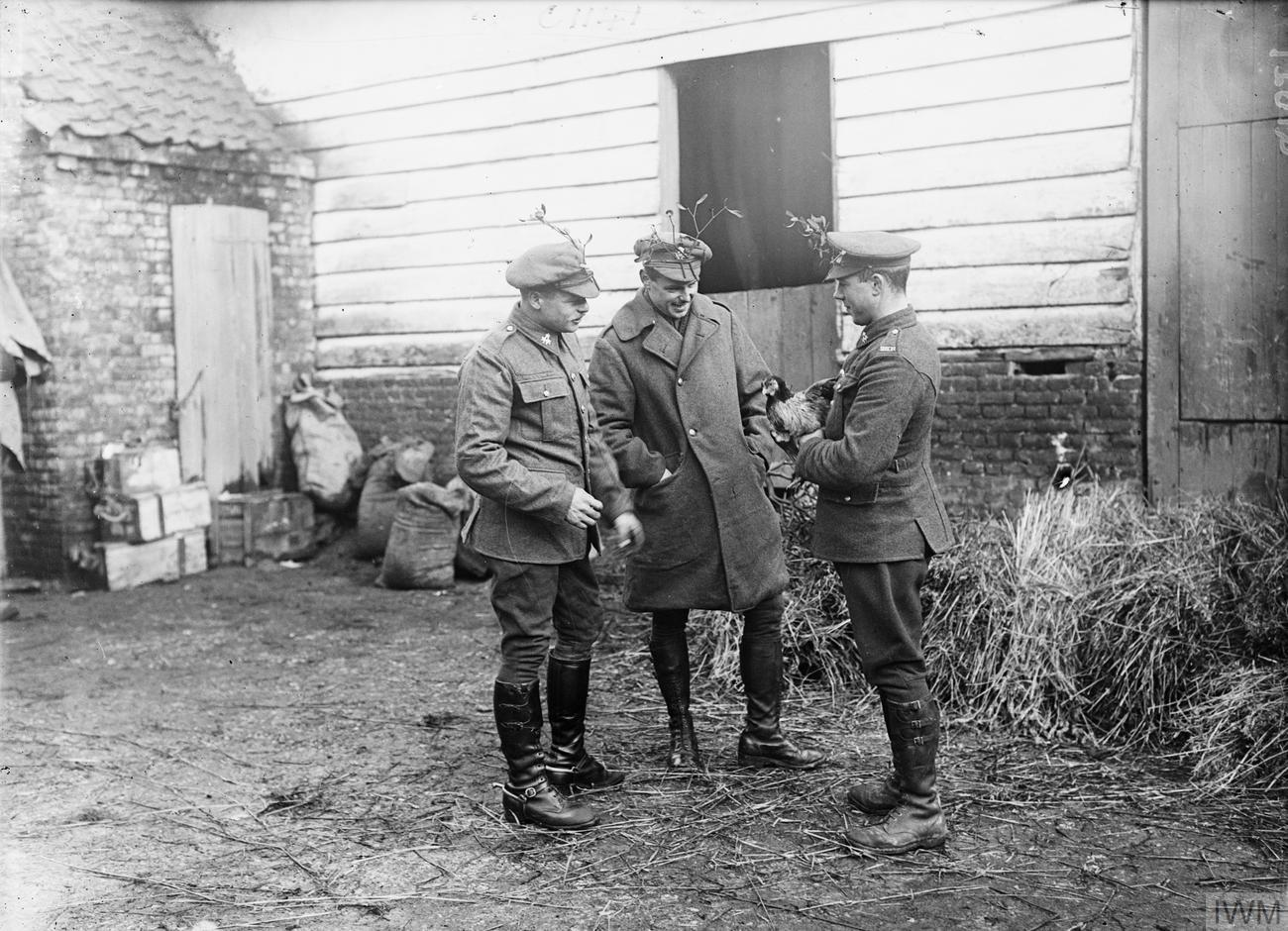
Soldiers celebrating Christmas on the western front, December 1916. Each has a sprig of mistletoe attached to his cap.

In the advent of the Christian era, mistletoe in the Western world became associated with Christmas as a decoration under which lovers are expected to kiss, as well as with protection from witches and demons. Mistletoe continued to be associated with fertility and vitality through the Middle Ages, and by the eighteenth century it had also become incorporated into Christmas celebrations around the world. The custom of kissing under the mistletoe is referred to as popular among servants in late eighteenth-century England.

The serving class of Victorian England is credited with perpetuating the tradition. The tradition dictated that a man was allowed to kiss any woman standing underneath mistletoe, and that bad luck would befall any woman who refused the kiss. One variation on the tradition stated that with each kiss a berry was to be plucked from the mistletoe, and the kissing must stop after all the berries had been removed.

From at least the mid-nineteenth century, Caribbean herbalists of African descent have referred to mistletoe as "god-bush".

In Nepal, diverse mistletoes are used for a variety of medical purposes, particularly for treating broken bones.

Mistletoe is the floral emblem of the U.S. state of Oklahoma and the flower of the UK county of Herefordshire. Every year, the UK town of Tenbury Wells holds a mistletoe festival and crowns a 'Mistletoe Queen'.

== See also ==
- Witch's broom, a growth of the host plant's own tissue, rather than a parasite in itself
- Festive ecology
- Kissing bough
- Viscum album
- Baldr
