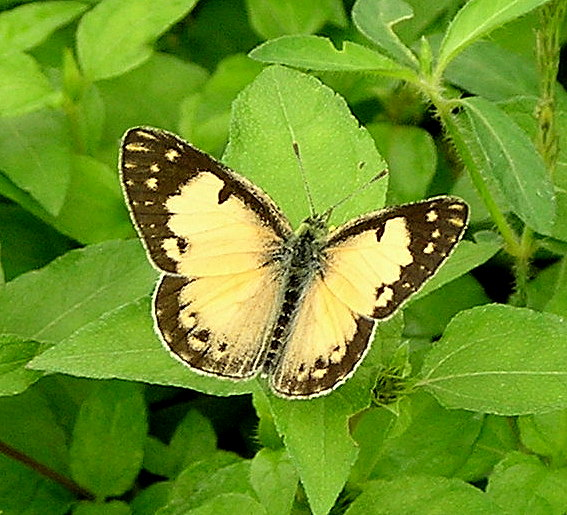

Scientific classification
- Kingdom: Animalia
- Phylum: Arthropoda
- Clade: Pancrustacea
- Class: Insecta
- Order: Lepidoptera
- Family: Pieridae
- Genus: Colotis
- Species: C. amata

Binomial name
- Colotis amata (Fabricius, 1775)

Synonyms
- Papilio amata Fabricius, 1775; Papilio cypraea Fabricius, 1787; Pontia dynamene Klug, 1829; Teracolus carnifer Butler, 1876; Teracolus kennedii Swinhoe, 1884; Pontia dynamene Klug, 1829; See also elsewhere under Colotis calais: Papilio calais Cramer, 1775; Teracolus modestus Butler, 1876; Teracolus crowleyi Sharpe, 1898; Teracolus amatus crowleyi ab. flavus Aurivillius, 1910; Colotis calais f. pallida Stoneham, 1939

= Colotis amata =

Small salmon Arab

Species of butterfly

Colotis amata, the Small Salmon Arab, is a small butterfly in the family Pieridae. It is primarily found in South Asia in countries like India, Pakistan and Sri Lanka.

Similar populations across Arabian Peninsula, Africa and Madagascar were earlier treated as being conspecific. However, based on later studies, they have been split and now regarded as a different species Colotis calais.

== Description ==
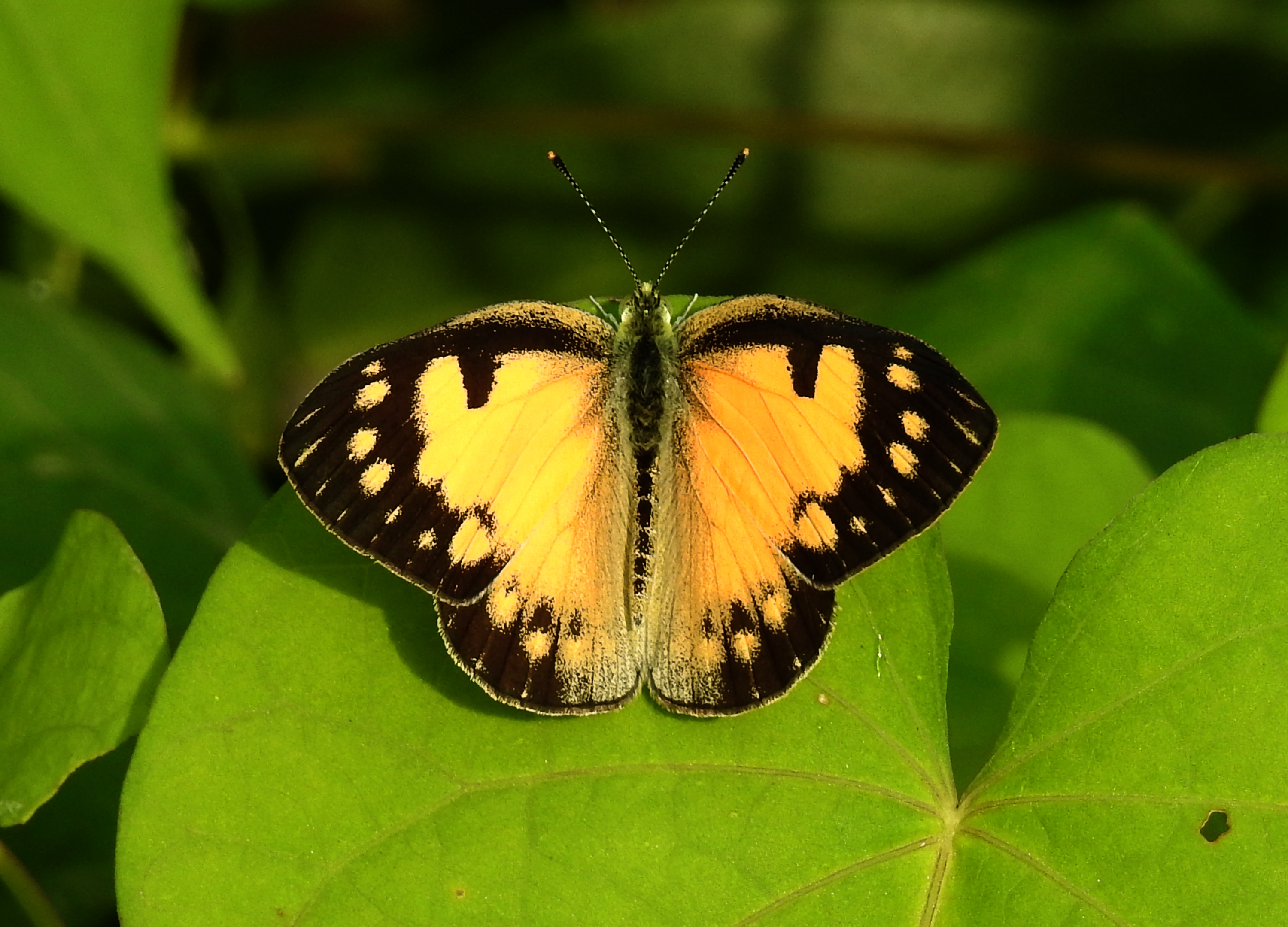
Dorsal view

The male's upperside has a salmon-pink ground colour. The costa on the forewing is black and thickly overlaid with greyish or pinkish scales; a black spot at apex of cell, which may be large and quadrate or smaller and lunate; termen broadly black, with an enclosed double transverse series of spots of the ground colour the inner series consists of a large spot in interspace 1, two very small spots in interspaces 2 and 3, one in each, and four larger anterior spots placed in a curve; the spots in the outer series are variable in number, but generally there is one in each interspace, these are more or less linear in shape. Hindwing: a band on costal margin extended to just within the upper margin of the cell, covered with dense black specialized scales; this black band joined onto a broad similarly coloured terminal band of ordinary scales, that becomes more or less diffuse and powdery posteriorly, and encloses a double series of small spots of the ground colour the inner series often obsolescent, in some specimens entirely absent; dorsum heavily irrorated with fuscous scales, the irroration extended onto the disc, which has therefore generally a greyish appearance.

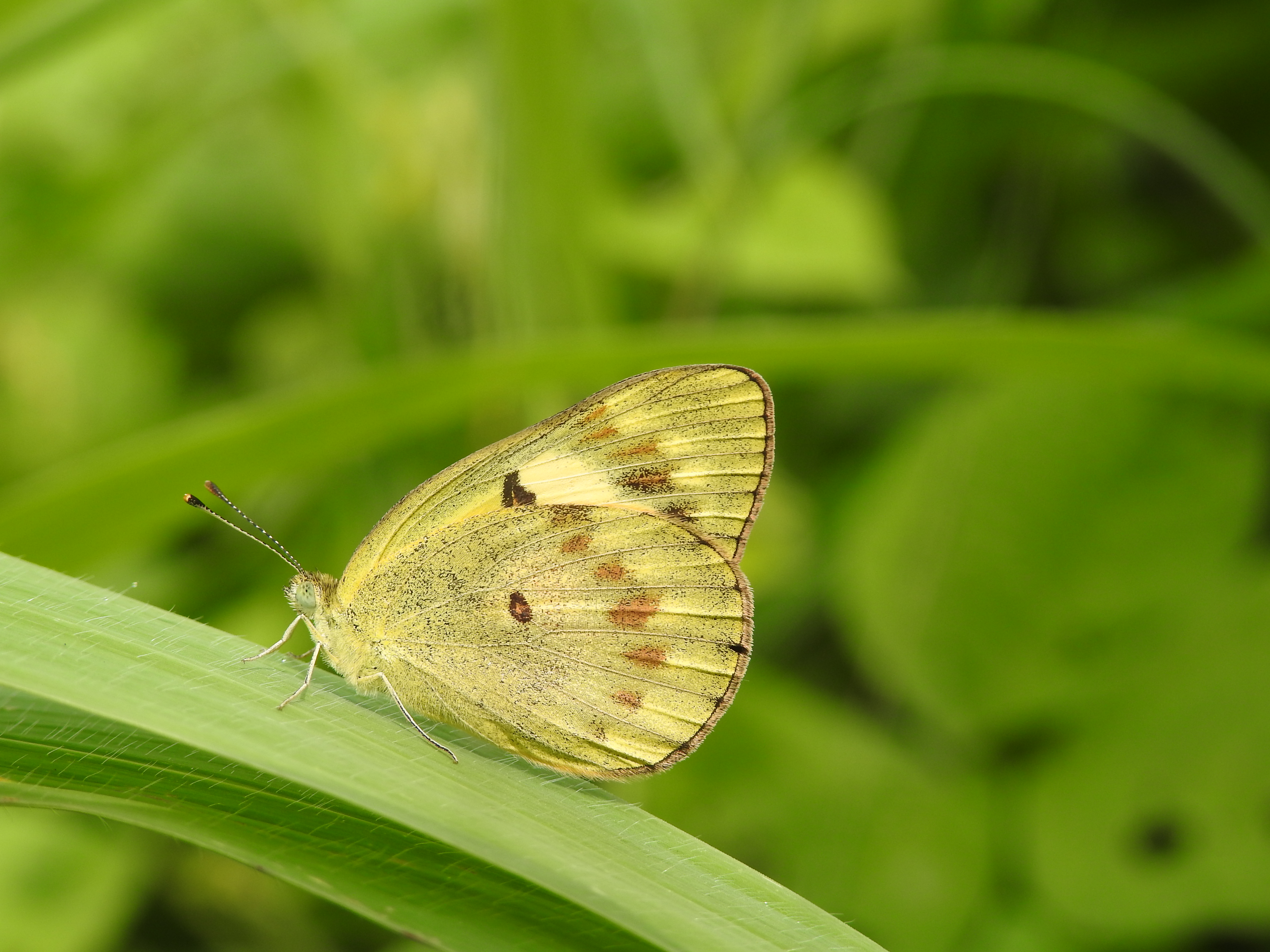
Ventral view

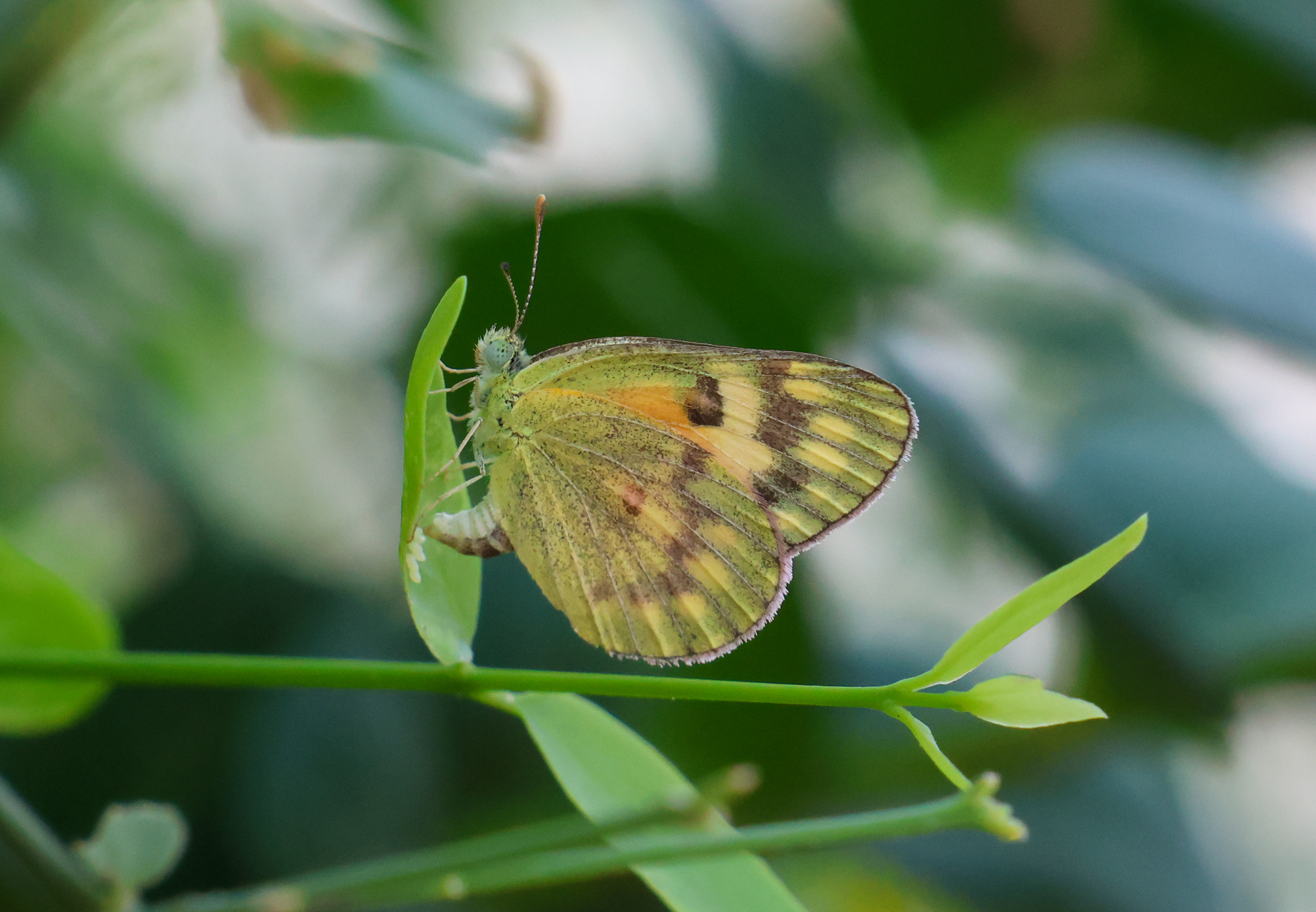
Small salmon Arab ovipositing on Salvadora persica, UAE

Underside: greenish yellow; an anteciliary fine black line on both forewing and hindwings; the black markings of the upperside show through by transparency. Forewing: a black spot, variable in size and intensity, in some specimens absent altogether, at apex of cell; a subterminal quadrate black spot in interspace 1 and another (sometimes faintly marked or absent) further outwards in interspace 2; disc faintly, dorsal margin broadly very pale salmon pink. Hindwing: the whole surface sparsely irrorated with minute black scales; a small black discocellular spot. Cilia of both forewings and hindwings pale salmon pink. Antennae, head, thorax and abdomen black, the antennae speckled with white, the head and thorax covered with greenish-fuscous hairs; beneath: the palpi green, thorax and abdomen white. The female is polymorphic. Form 1. Upperside: ground colour paler than in the male, in some specimens quite ochraceous outwardly; all the markings similar, but duller in tint. The hindwing, of course, without the black costal band of specialized scales, the ground colour extended up to the costal margin. Underside similar to that of the male, but the ground colour very much paler and more ochraceous than green. In some specimens, in addition to the black spots in interspaces 1 and 2 on forewing, there is an anterior postdiscal fuscous curved band. Hindwing: discocellular spot larger than in the 3 and annular; a curved discal series of reddish spots from costa to dorsum. Form 2. Similar to female form 1, but the ground colour pale primrose yellow to pure white. Antennae, head, thorax and abdomen in both forms much as in the male.

== Life history ==
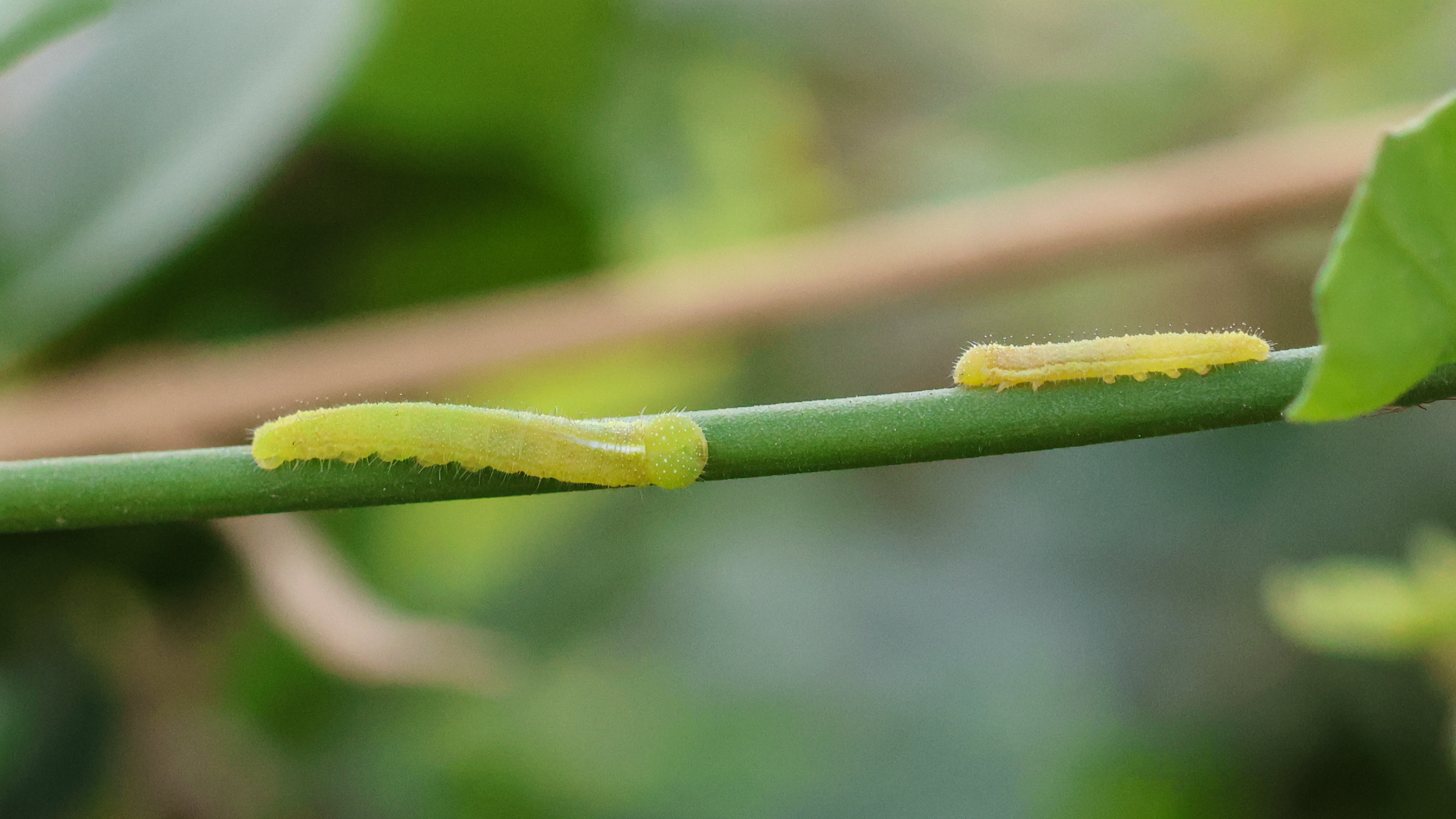
Caterpillars of small salmon Arab on Salvadora persica, UAE

Eggs: The female seeks out the host plant – usually a Salvadora shrub or tree – and settles on a suitable leaf where oviposition takes place. This species is gregarious ovipositor – meaning it lays eggs in clutches as opposed to many other butterfly species that lay their eggs singly on each leaf or shoot. The number of eggs in a clutch can consist of only a couple of eggs to as many as around 60. Females usually visit multiple host plants and oviposit multiple such clutches of varying sizes in their lifetime.

Larva: "Very like that of Eurema, cylindrical or slightly depressed with a rough surface due to minute tubercles, from each of which grows a very small bristle. The colour is a uniform grass-green, with a blue dorsal line more or less distinct, and a yellowish lateral line dividing the colour of the back from the paler green of the underparts." (Davidson & Aitken quoted in Bingham). The caterpillars feed on Salvadora trees.

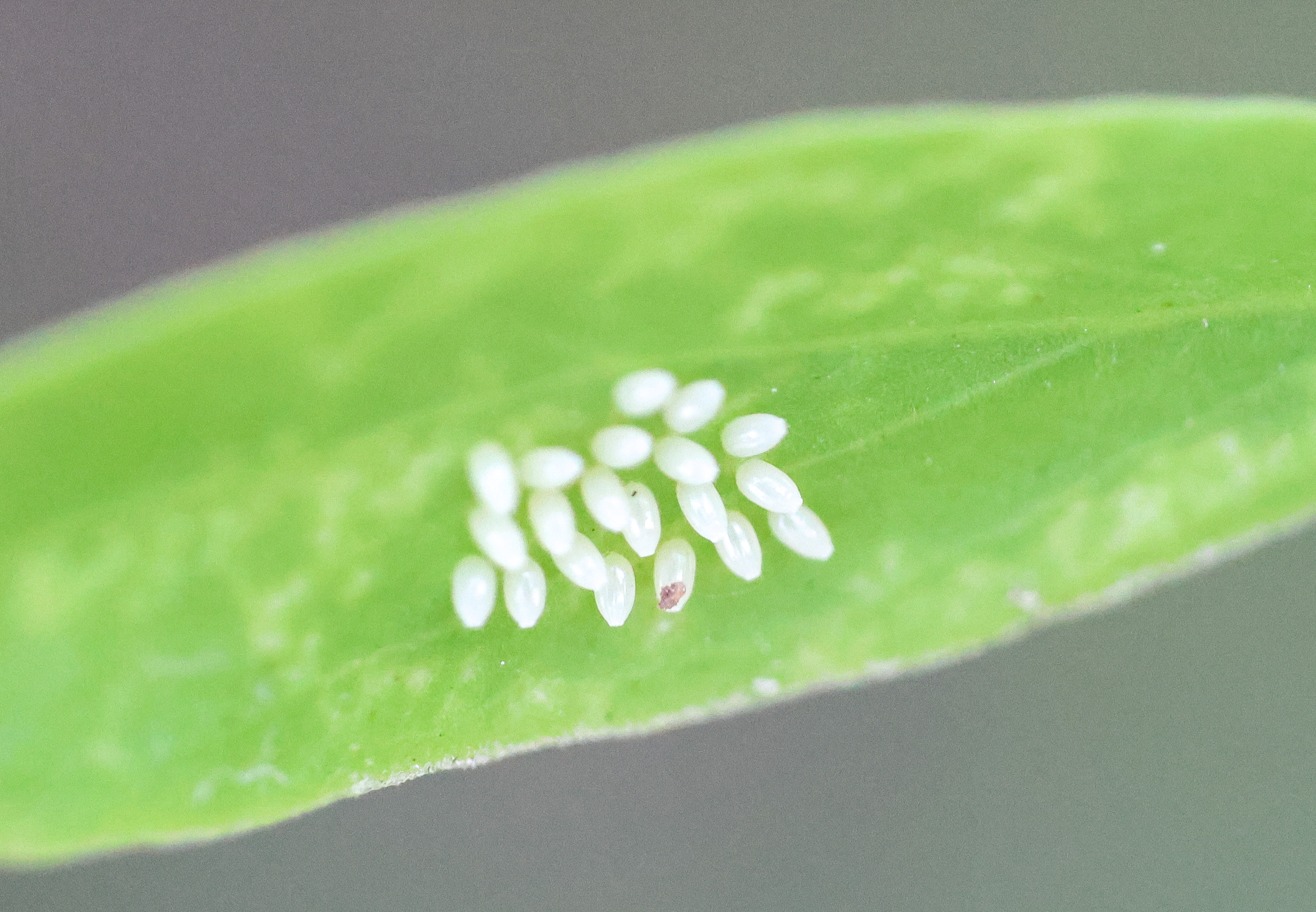
Eggs of small salmon Arab on Salvadora persica, UAE

Pupa: "Compressed; wing-cases produced into a keel like that of Eurema. It is suspended in the same manner by the tail and a moderately long band. The colour is usually some shade of dingy whitish brown or dirty green." (Davidson & Aitken quoted in Bingham)

== Ecology ==
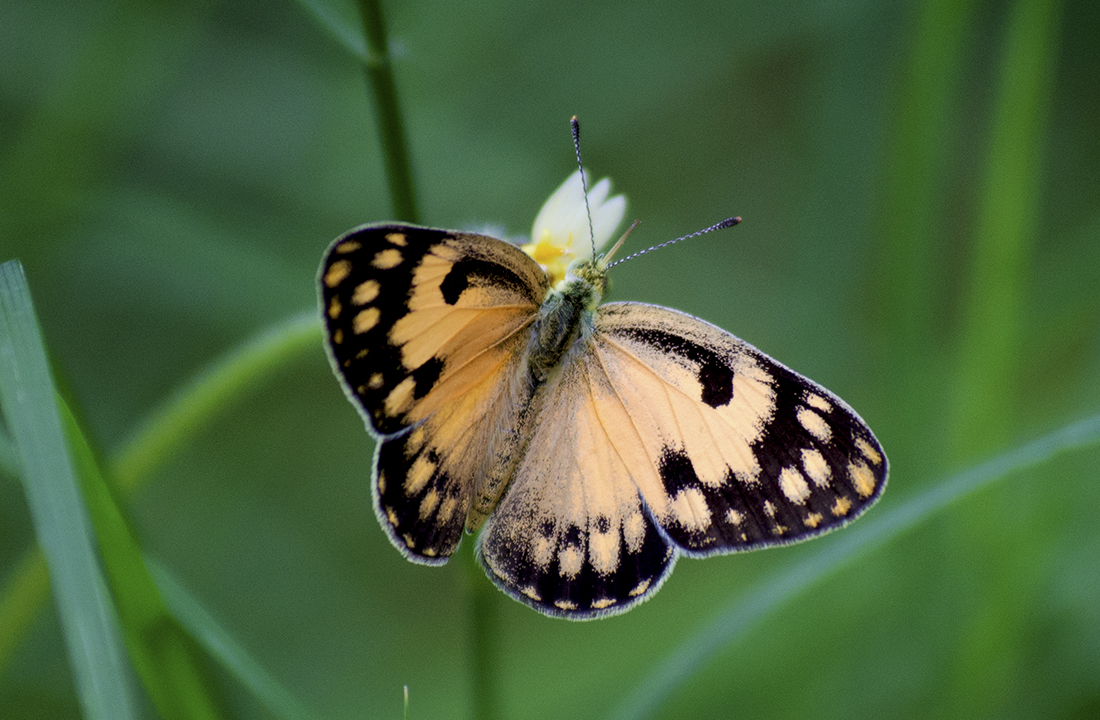
Small salmon Arab feeding on the nectar of Tridax procumbens

Small Salmon Arabs mainly use various species from the family salvadoraceae as their host plant. Species like Salvadora persica grow readily in saline lands across Indian subcontinent, often making these butterflies abundant along the coastal areas of elevated soil-salinity and tidal mudflats. Small Salmon Arabs are also common inland in arid, semi-arid or seasonally dry landscapes where host species like S. persica, S. oleoides and Azima tetracantha are present. In northwestern India (Gujarat, Rajasthan, Haryana, Punjab and Delhi) and Pakistan it shares its range with White Arab (Colotis vestalis) which is another Salvadora-dependent species.

Small Salmon Arab has also been noted to use Zanthoxylum asiaticum (syn. Toddalia asiatica) as its host plant, despite the plant belonging to the family rutaceae (citrus family) as opposed to the usually preferred salvadoraceae.

Adult butterflies are fond of smaller flowers for nectar and often fly low along the ground in search of wildflowers.

== Subspecies ==
- C. a. amata (Western and Northern India, Pakistan )
- C. a. modesta (Butler, 1876) (Peninsular India, Sri Lanka)

Former subspecies, since revised under Colotis calais after Nazari et al. 2011.

- C. a. calais (Cramer, 1775) (Mauritania, northern Senegal, Gambia, Mali, north-eastern Nigeria, Niger, Zambia, northern Botswana, Zimbabwe, Mozambique, Eswatini, South Africa, southern Arabia)
- C. a. crowleyi (Sharpe, 1898) (Madagascar)
- C. a. williami Henning & Henning, 1994 (central and northern Namibia)

== Gallery ==
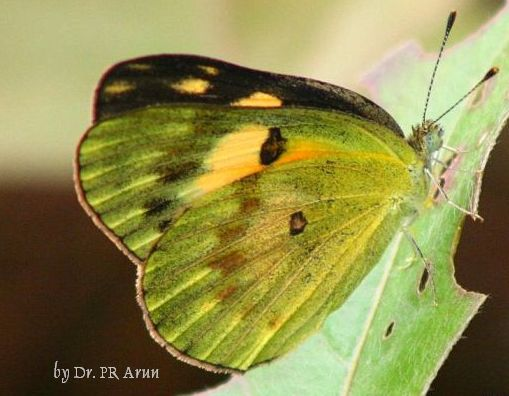
At Vikhroli, Mumbai

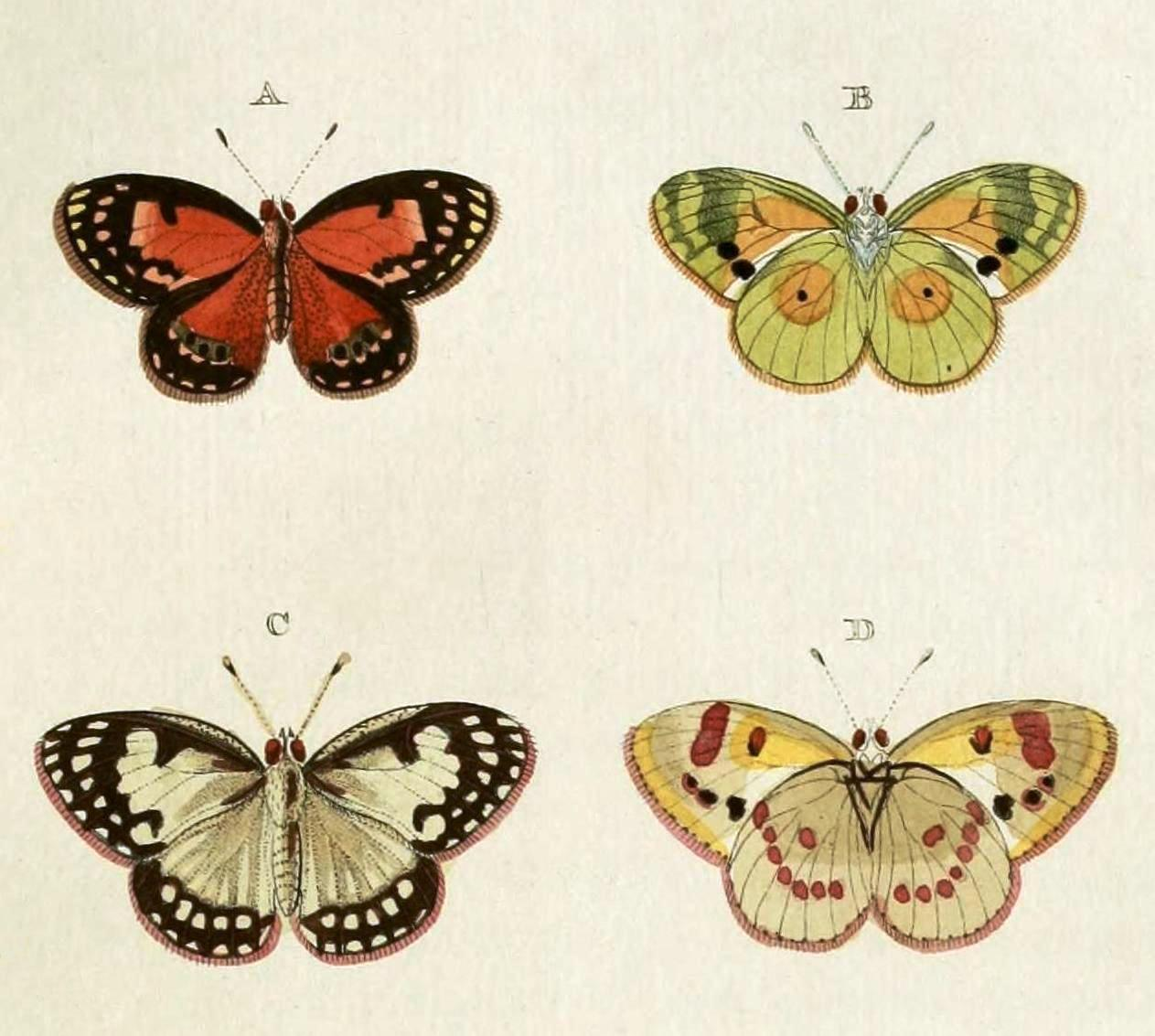
Male upper and underside
Female upper and underside

== See also ==
- List of butterflies of India
- List of butterflies of India (Pieridae)
