= Agelanthus kayseri =

Conservation status
- Least Concern (IUCN 3.1)

Scientific classification
- Kingdom: Plantae
- Clade: Tracheophytes
- Clade: Angiosperms
- Clade: Eudicots
- Order: Santalales
- Family: Loranthaceae
- Genus: Agelanthus
- Species: A. kayseri

Binomial name
- Agelanthus kayseri (Engl.) Polhill & Wiens

Synonyms
- Loranthus kayseri Engl.; Tapinanthus kayseri (Engl.) Danser; Loranthus rhodanthus Chiov.

Species of mistletoe

Agelanthus kayseri is a species of hemiparasitic plant in the family Loranthaceae, which is native to Kenya, Tanzania and Somalia.

== Description ==
A description of the plant is given in Govaerts et al.

== Habitat/ecology ==
A. kayseri is found in coastal bushland and mangrove stands, extending inland along rivers, commonly on Dobera, Salvadora or mangroves, based on Polhill & Wiens.
