= Iolaus congdoni =

Scientific classification
- Kingdom: Animalia
- Phylum: Arthropoda
- Class: Insecta
- Order: Lepidoptera
- Family: Lycaenidae
- Genus: Iolaus
- Species: I. congdoni

Binomial name
- Iolaus congdoni (Kielland, 1985)

Synonyms
- Epamera congdoni Kielland, 1985; Iolaus (Epamera) congdoni; Epamera congdoni uluguru Kielland, 1985

Species of butterfly

Iolaus congdoni is a butterfly in the family Lycaenidae. It is found in Tanzania, Malawi (the Nyika Plateau) and Zambia. The habitat consists of montane forests at altitudes of about 2,000 metres.

The larvae feed on Tapinanthus sansibarensis, Agelanthus zizyphifolius vittatus, Agelanthus atrocoronatus, Agelanthus uhehensis, Agelanthus bipartitus, Phragmanthera rufescens, Oedina pendens and Helixanthera verruculosa.
