= Dobera glabra =

Scientific classification
- Kingdom: Plantae
- Clade: Tracheophytes
- Clade: Angiosperms
- Clade: Eudicots
- Clade: Rosids
- Order: Brassicales
- Family: Salvadoraceae
- Genus: Dobera
- Species: D. glabra

Binomial name
- Dobera glabra (Forssk.) Juss. ex Poir.

Species of tree

Dobera glabra is an evergreen shrub or tree native to the Somali peninsula, Northeastern Kenya and Ethiopia as well as South Tihamah. In Somali speaking regions, it is widely known as Garas. In Ethiopia, it is found in Nechisar National Park and along the Sagan River in the Konso special woreda. It is also sparsely distributed in Afar Region where the tree is much known for its fruits. It is known to grow up to 10 m (33 ft).

It is well known to the local Konso people (who call it karsata) for growing new shoots, flowers, and seeds during dry weather. They use it as an indicator of potential famine and drought conditions. D. glabra produces edible fruits and the seed is considered a typical famine food. However, the fruits must be cooked for a long time (i.e. up to 24 hours), they have a bad smell, and excessive consumption causes stomach aches and other intestinal problems.

General description

It is an much branched evergreen shrub or tree up to 8m. The bark is green to dark grey and patchy. Leaves are opposite, yellow to grey-green, thick, smooth, veins hardly seen, up to 7 cm long, tip usually notched. Flowers are small and white in colour. Fruits are ovoid to 2 cm, with 1 - 2 flat seeds. Paradoxically it produces better and more seeds in dry spell (under moisture stress conditions) than in normal times.
