= Pilu oil =

Oil extracted from Pilu tree seeds

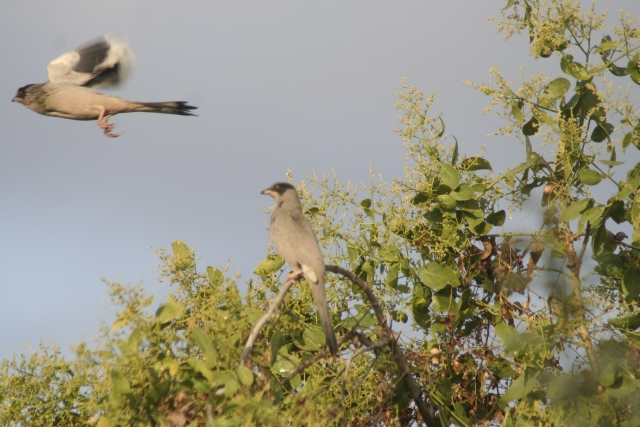
pilu tree

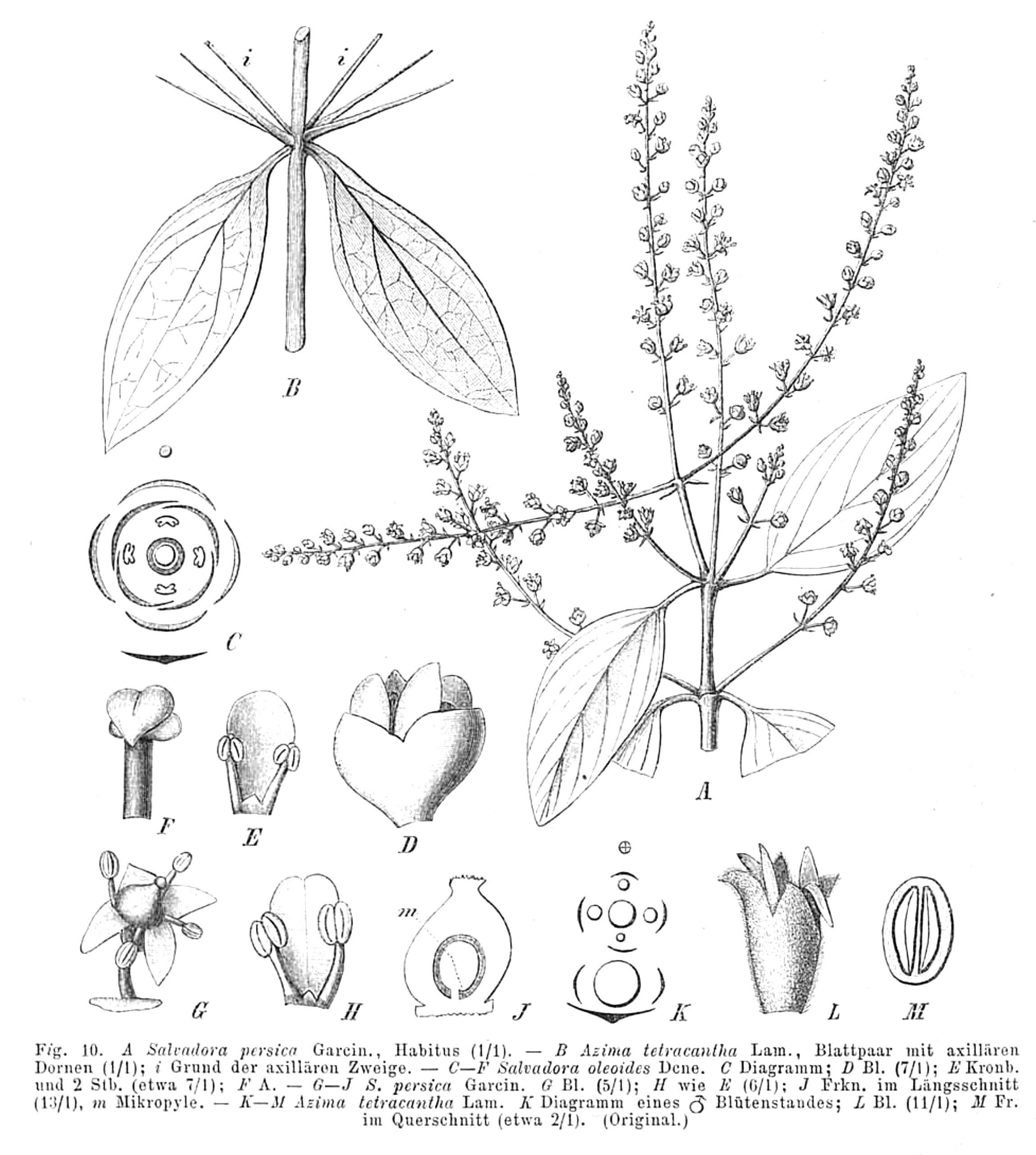
Salvadora persica

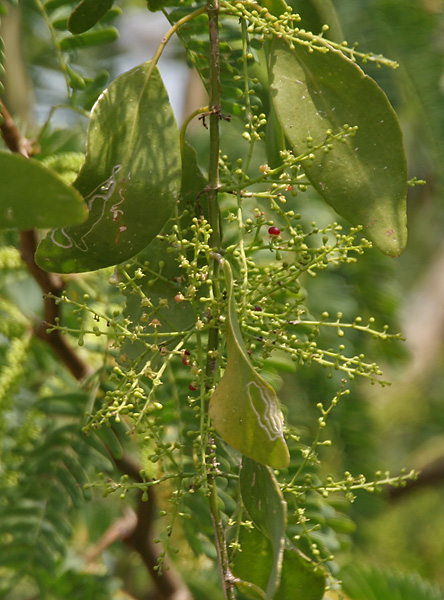
Salvadora persica

Pilu oil is an extract from seeds of the Pilu tree (Salvadora persica), also known as the toothbrush tree. It is used for soaps, detergents, and resist dyeing.

== Characteristics ==
The oil comes from the seed and kernel. The percentage of the oil in seeds is 32-34%. The seed contains a brittle shell on the outer surface, and the kernel accounts for 60% in dried seed, containing 40-43% oil.

‘Sweet Variety’ of Pilu yields 35-44% oil which has a strong odour. The odour is due to the presence of Benzyl isothiocyanate in the oil. There is greenish yellow fat called Khakan fat. The purified fat is free from foul odour and has an agreeable taste. It is snow white. The oil is rich in lauric and myristic acids. It has a high melting point and a disagreeable odour that disappears on purification. The most important aspect of the oil is the presence of a low percentage of C8 and C10 fatty acids that are of great economic significance. The oil is an alternative source of oil for soap and detergent industries.

Physical Characteristics of Pilu Oil

property	range
Refractive index 40 °C	1.4465
Saponification value	251.2
Iodine value	15.6
polenske value	10.9
Reichert-Meissl value	5.9
solidifying point	31.1 °C
Specific gravity(35.5 °C/15.5 °C)	0.9246

Fatty Acid Composition of Pilu Oil

fatty acid	percentage
Capric acid(C10:0)	1.0-1.5
Lauric acid(C12:0)	19.6-47.2
Myristic acid(C14:0)	28.4-54.5
Palmitic acid(C16:)	18.9-29.5
Oleic acid(C18:1)	5.5-12.0
linoleic acid(C18:2)	0.0-1.2

== Uses ==
The fat is used in soap, making up to 20% of the soap itself, and it replaces coconut oil. It is used as a resist in the dyeing industry. The oil is also used in rheumatic infection treatment.

In India Pilu fat is being used for soap making in the "unorganised" or cottage sector of the industry, particularly by the Non-Edible Oil Industry of the Khadi and Village Industries commission. The All India Non-Edible Oil Industry Association, Poona, are making soap with it. The oil has a bitter and sharp taste and may be used as a purgative diuretic, or tonic seed oil may be applied to the skin in rheumatism.

== See also ==
- Salvadora persica
- Salvadora oleoides
- Salvadora (plant)
