= Azima sarmentosa =

Conservation status
- Least Concern (IUCN 3.1)

Scientific classification
- Kingdom: Plantae
- Clade: Tracheophytes
- Clade: Angiosperms
- Clade: Eudicots
- Clade: Rosids
- Order: Brassicales
- Family: Salvadoraceae
- Genus: Azima
- Species: A. sarmentosa

Binomial name
- Azima sarmentosa (Blume) Benth. & Hook.f.

Synonyms
- Actegeton sarmentosus Blume (1827) (basionym); Azima nova Blanco; Azima scandens Baill.; Monetia brunoniana Wall.; Monetia laxa Planch.; Monetia sarmentosa Baill.; Salvadora madurensis Decne.

Species of flowering plant

Azima sarmentosa is a species of flowering plant in the Salvadoraceae family. It is a shrub or tree native to Indochina (Cambodia, Laos, Myanmar, Thailand, and Vietnam), southern Hainan, the Philippines, Java, the Lesser Sunda Islands, Sulawesi, and New Guinea.

The species was first described as Actegeton sarmentosus by Carl Ludwig Blume in 1827. In 1876 George Bentham and Joseph Dalton Hooker placed the species in genus Azima as A. sarmentosa.
