= Iolaus montana =

Scientific classification
- Kingdom: Animalia
- Phylum: Arthropoda
- Class: Insecta
- Order: Lepidoptera
- Family: Lycaenidae
- Genus: Iolaus
- Species: I. montana

Binomial name
- Iolaus montana (Kielland, 1978)

Synonyms
- Iolaphilus montana Kielland, 1978; Iolaus (Argiolaus) montana

Species of butterfly

Iolaus montana is a butterfly in the family Lycaenidae. It is found in Tanzania. The habitat consists of forests (including riverine forests).

The larvae feed on Phragmanthera rufescens and Phragmanthera usuiensis.
