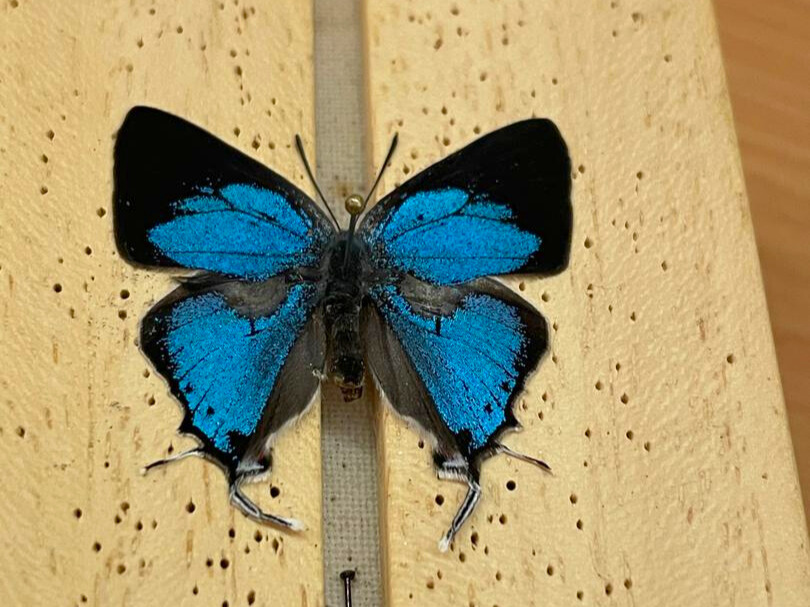
- A pinned Iolaus francisi displaying iridescent blue wings framed by black borders and white-tipped tails

Scientific classification
- Kingdom: Animalia
- Phylum: Arthropoda
- Clade: Pancrustacea
- Class: Insecta
- Order: Lepidoptera
- Family: Lycaenidae
- Genus: Iolaus
- Species: I. francisi

Binomial name
- Iolaus francisi Gardiner, 2025

= Iolaus francisi =

Species of butterfly endemic to Angola

Iolaus francisi, commonly known as Francis's sapphire or Francis's gorgeous sapphire, is a species of butterfly in the family Lycaenidae. It is endemic to the Namba Mountains of Angola, where it inhabits patches of Afromontane evergreen forest at elevations between 2,100 and 2,390 metres above sea level. The species was formally described in 2025 by Alan J. Gardiner in the journal Zootaxa, based on specimens collected during expeditions in 2022 and 2023. It is classified within the subgenus Iolaphilus of the genus Iolaus and is notable for the male's brilliant structural blue coloration and the female's diagnostically unique underside wing pattern.

== Taxonomy and etymology ==
The discovery of Iolaus francisi resulted from targeted biodiversity surveys of the Namba Mountains, a region historically under-explored due to the effects of the Angolan Civil War. In October 2022, the Zimbabwean naturalist and lepidopterist Jonathan Francis collected unknown lycaenid caterpillars feeding on mistletoe in the high-altitude forests of the Namba range. Francis transported the larvae to Harare, Zimbabwe, where he reared them to adulthood on substitute mistletoe leaves from his garden, as the specific Namba mistletoe species was unavailable outside its native range. The resulting adult specimens were females, which displayed a wing pattern not matching any known species.

A return expedition in May 2023 secured a male specimen. Dissection and examination of the male genitalia by Dr Alan J. Gardiner confirmed the butterfly as a species new to science. The formal description was published in Zootaxa in July 2025.

The specific epithet francisi is a patronym honouring Jonathan Francis, the collector and rearer of the type specimens. The honour recognises Francis's dual role in locating the larvae in the field and successfully rearing the species in captivity, which enabled the documentation of the female phenotype and early life-history stages.

Iolaus francisi is placed in the subgenus Iolaphilus Stempffer & Bennett, 1958, within the tribe Iolaini of the subfamily Theclinae. Gardiner (2025) noted that I. francisi shares morphological affinities with other large "sapphire" species such as Iolaus cottrelli, but is distinct in both external morphology and genitalic structure.

== Description ==
Iolaus francisi exhibits marked sexual dimorphism, a trait common in the tribe Iolaini.

=== Male ===
The holotype male has a wingspan of 32.3 mm and a forewing length of 17 mm, placing it among the larger members of the genus. The dorsal surface of the wings is a brilliant, shimmering blue, a structural coloration produced by the interference of light with the lattice microstructure of the wing scales rather than by pigment. This blue area covers approximately half of the forewing, radiating from the base and bounded by broad black borders. The ventral surface, in contrast, is silvery-white and patterned with fine orange and brown lines, serving as camouflage when the butterfly rests with its wings closed.

The head is white with distinct black bands. The antennae are black to dark brown with white scaling on the ventral surface of each segment, and the legs are predominantly white with black patches on the inner surfaces of the tarsi. On the upperside of the hindwing, the male possesses a large, circular androconial sex brand occupying parts of wing spaces 6 and 7; its centre is beige, encircled by concentric rings of black, then grey scales showing a purplish reflection, and finally an outer black band.

=== Female ===
The female is larger and more robustly built than the male. The paratype female has a wingspan of approximately 30 mm, though individual variation occurs. The outer margin of the forewing is more strongly curved inward than in the male, giving the butterfly a broader wing shape. The dorsal surface lacks the intense iridescence of the male, instead displaying a duller, deeper blue mixed with extensive black areas.

The ventral surface of the female shares the silvery ground colour and orange-brown linear pattern of the male but bears a distinctive extra stripe that is absent in the male and in all other described Iolaus species. This diagnostic feature allows identification of females without the need for genitalic dissection. As in the male, the female has hairstreak tails on the hindwing at veins 1b and 2 and an anal-lobe eyespot in red and black, which together form a false head that can deflect predatory strikes toward the expendable wing margins.

=== Comparative morphology ===
Comparison of male and female Iolaus francisi
Feature	Male (holotype)	Female (paratype)
Wingspan	32.3 mm	~30 mm
Forewing shape	Acute, straight outer margin	Broad, curved outer margin
Dorsal colour	Brilliant structural blue	Dull, deeper blue with extensive black
Ventral pattern	Silvery-white with orange-brown lines	Silvery-white with orange-brown lines + diagnostic extra stripe
Androconial sex brand	Large, circular, multi-zoned	Absent
Hindwing tails and false head	Present	Present

== Distribution and habitat ==
Iolaus francisi is a narrow-range endemic, currently recorded exclusively from the Namba Mountains in Cuanza Sul Province, western-central Angola.

Habitat summary
Parameter	Value
Coordinates	~11.83°–11.91°S, 14.71°–14.86°E
Elevation	2,100–2,390 m
Forest area	~590 ha (~24 patches)
Forest type	Afromontane evergreen
Dominant canopy species	Podocarpus latifolius
Larval host plant	Phragmanthera sp. (mistletoe)
Legal protection	None

The Namba Mountains form part of a chain of isolated high-altitude "sky islands" rising above the Bié Plateau. Their Afromontane forests are climatic relicts, remnants of a once more widespread forest cover that contracted to mountaintops as the African climate became warmer and drier over geological time. The approximately 590 hectares of forest in the Namba range represent the largest remaining block of Afromontane forest in Angola, fragmented into roughly 24 distinct patches. The forest canopy is evergreen, with Podocarpus latifolius (real yellowwood) among the dominant tree species, and the understory supports abundant epiphytes, mosses, and hemiparasitic mistletoes of the genus Phragmanthera, the obligate larval host plant of the butterfly.

The Namba Mountains are separated from the nearby Mount Moco by approximately 80–100 km of unsuitable lowland habitat, chiefly Miombo woodland and grassland. This long-term geographic isolation has driven independent evolutionary divergence among the biota of each mountain, contributing to the high levels of local endemism observed in the Namba range.

== Ecology ==
=== Host plant and larval biology ===
The larvae of I. francisi are obligate feeders on mistletoes of the genus Phragmanthera (Loranthaceae), woody hemiparasites that grow on the branches of forest trees. The caterpillar is cryptically coloured to mimic the hairy buds of its Phragmanthera host, rendering it difficult for visual predators such as warblers and chameleons to detect. This larval mimicry is a widespread adaptation among members of the tribe Iolaini.

As with other Iolaini, I. francisi is likely myrmecophilous, with larvae possessing a dorsal nectary organ that secretes nutritive fluids to attendant ants in exchange for protection from parasitoids.

=== Adult behaviour ===
Adult males have been observed flying along the sunlit sides of forest trees and perching territorially on prominent branches in the forest canopy. Their flight is rapid and erratic, and they spend considerable time basking, likely to thermoregulate in the cool high-altitude environment. Adults have been recorded in May (end of the wet season) and October (start of the wet season), suggesting the species may be bivoltine.

== Conservation ==
Iolaus francisi is considered critically imperilled owing to its extremely restricted range and the ongoing degradation of its habitat, though it has not yet been formally assessed by the IUCN.

The principal threat is fire. Farmers in the surrounding lowlands burn grasslands annually for land clearance and hunting, and these fires have increasingly penetrated the forest margins, killing fire-sensitive mistletoes in the canopy even when the larger trees survive. Frequent burning also prevents the regeneration of fire-resistant edge vegetation, creating a positive feedback loop of progressive forest retreat. Beyond fire, slash-and-burn agriculture for potato and maize cultivation is encroaching upslope into the forest zone, and selective logging for construction timber targets the oldest trees—those most heavily laden with mistletoe colonies.

Despite harbouring the largest area of Afromontane forest in Angola, the Namba Mountains currently hold no formal legal protection status. Conservation efforts rely on community engagement, linked to local recognition of the mountains as vital watersheds. Conservationists have drawn parallels with the rapid deforestation of Kumbira Forest, another Angolan Afromontane site, as a cautionary precedent for the potential trajectory of the Namba forests without intervention.

== See also ==
- Iolaus (butterfly)
- Lycaenidae
- Afromontane
