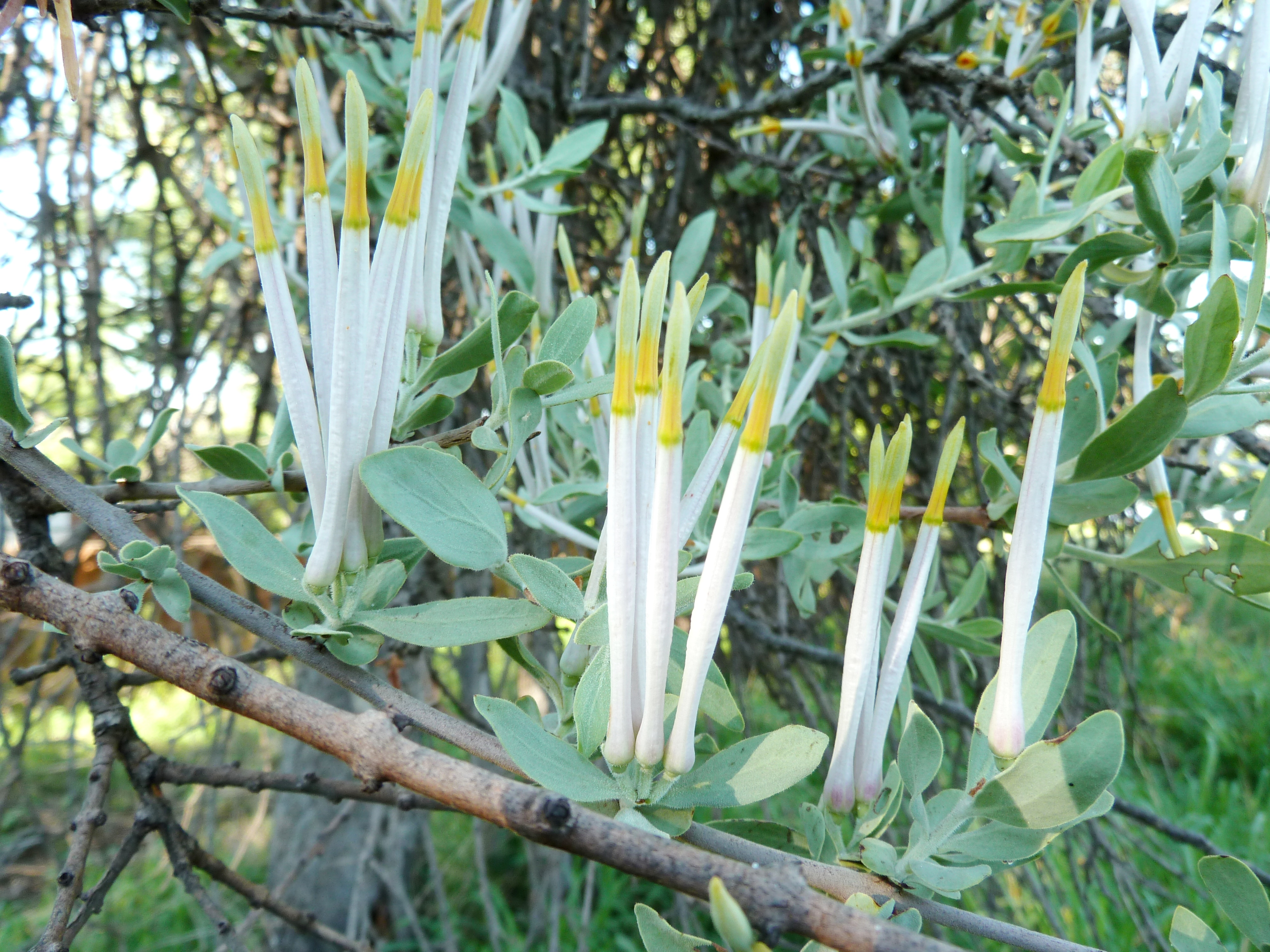
- A. natalitius subsp. zeyheri in South Africa

Scientific classification
- Kingdom: Plantae
- Clade: Tracheophytes
- Clade: Angiosperms
- Clade: Eudicots
- Order: Santalales
- Family: Loranthaceae
- Genus: Agelanthus; Tiegh.

= Agelanthus =

Genus of mistletoes

Agelanthus is a genus of Afrotropical plants in the family Loranthaceae. They grow in trees, including Acacia and Combretum species, as hemiparasitic shrubs of varying sizes. The host plant is penetrated by a single haustorium, and the stems typically have swollen, flower-producing nodes. The flowers are often closely clustered (fascicled) with the five petals (pentamerous) fused into a tube (gamopetalous). (Note: Flowers of the closely related genus Phragmanthera are similar in many respects.) The flower may have a swollen base and the tubes open along unilateral, V-shaped splits. The filaments remain spirally rolled inward when the flowers open, while the styles are inconspicuous, slender filaments that are somewhat thickened in the middle. Berries range from pink to orange and red, and are around 1 cm in diameter.

The genus was first described by Philippe Édouard Léon Van Tieghem in 1895.

== Species ==
It is the largest genus of the Afrotropical Loranthaceae containing some 61 species, including:

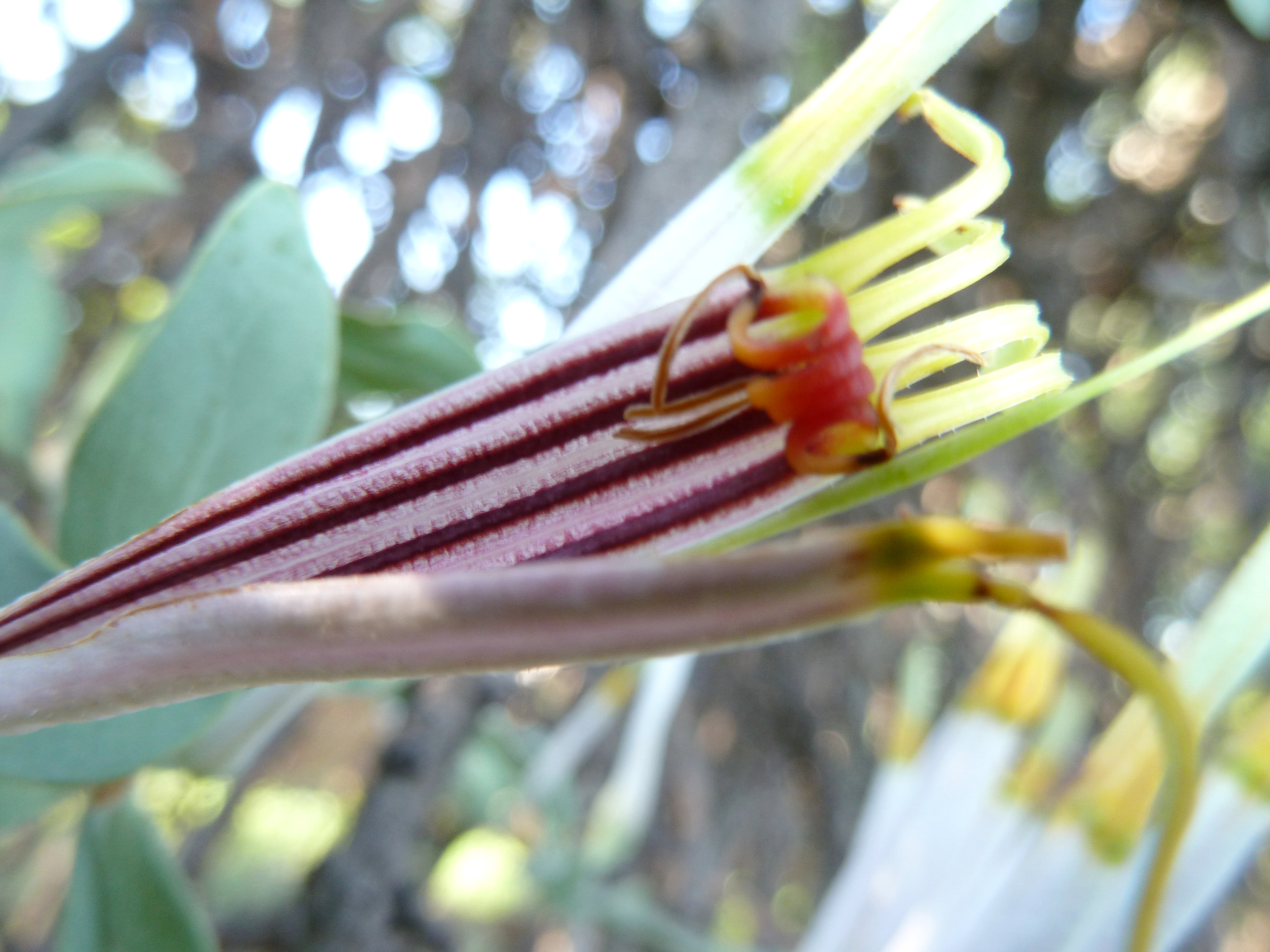
Open flower with spirally rolled filaments

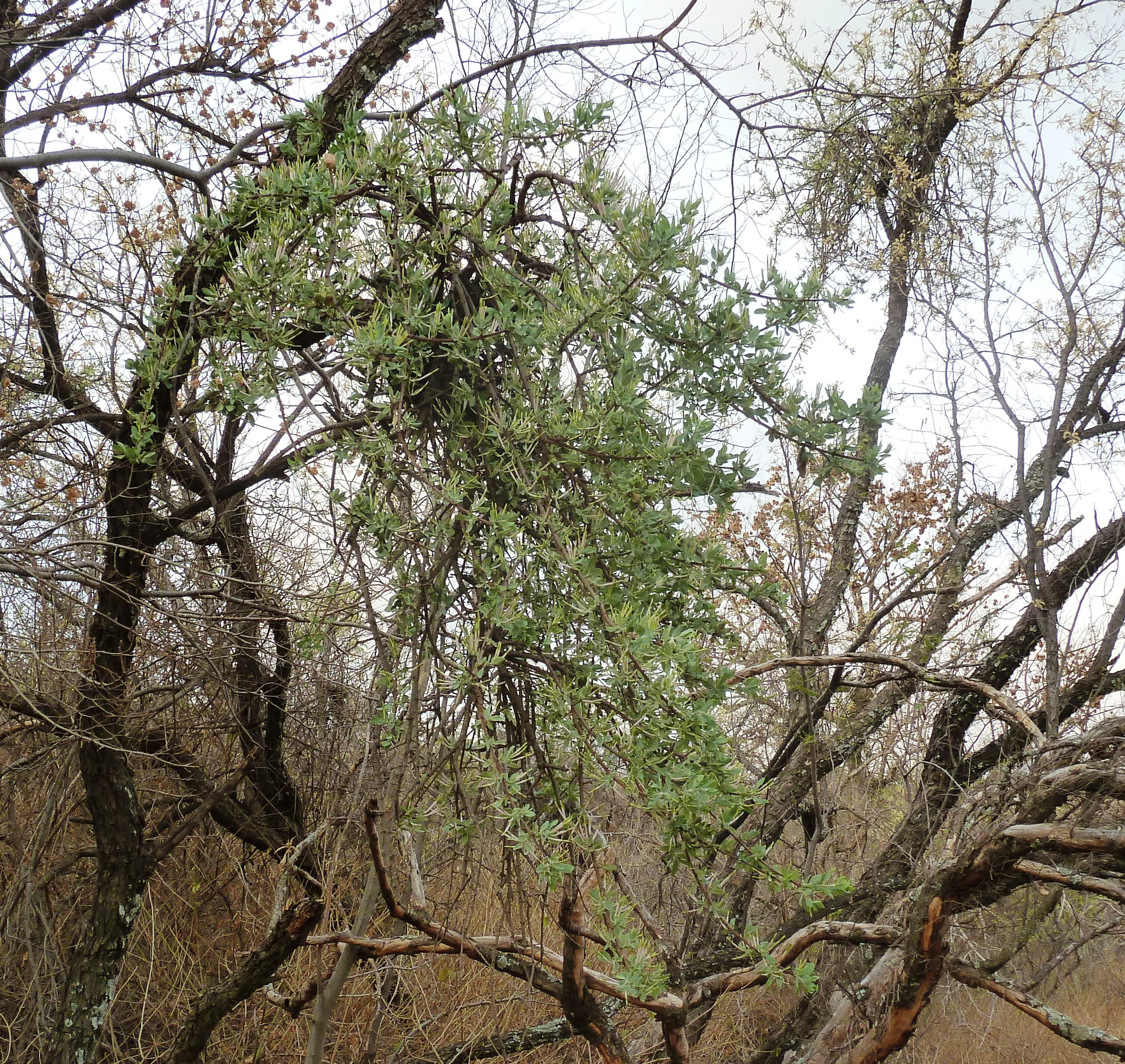
Habit of A. natalitius

- Agelanthus atrocoronatus Polhill & Wiens
- Agelanthus bipartitus Balle ex Polhill & Wiens
- Agelanthus brunneus (Engl.) Tiegh.
- Agelanthus combreticola (Lebrun & L.Touss.) Polhill & Wiens
- Agelanthus copaiferae (Sprague) Polhill & Wiens
- Agelanthus igneus (Engl. & K.Krause) Polhill & Wiens
- Agelanthus kayseri (Meisn.) Polhill & Wiens
- Agelanthus keilii (Meisn.) Polhill & Wiens
- Agelanthus longipes (Baker & Sprague) Polhill & Wiens
- Agelanthus microphyllus Polhill & Wiens
- Agelanthus myrsinifolius (Engl. & K.Krause) Polhill & Wiens
- Agelanthus natalitius (Meisn.) Polhill & Wiens
- Agelanthus nyasicus (Baker & Sprague) Polhill & Wiens
- Agelanthus pennatulus (Sprague) Polhill & Wiens
- Agelanthus pungu (De Wild.) Polhill & Wiens
- Agelanthus rondensis (Engl.) Polhill & Wiens
- Agelanthus tanganyikae (Engl.) Polhill & Wiens
- Agelanthus terminaliae (Engl. & Gilg) Polhill & Wiens
- Agelanthus toroensis (Sprague) Polhill & Wiens
- Agelanthus transvaalensis (Sprague) Polhill & Wiens
- Agelanthus uhehensis (Engl.) Polhill & Wiens
- Agelanthus unyorensis (Sprague) Polhill & Wiens
- Agelanthus validus Polhill & Wiens
- Agelanthus villosiflorus (Engl.) Polhill & Wiens
- Agelanthus zizyphifolius (Engl.) Polhill & Wiens
