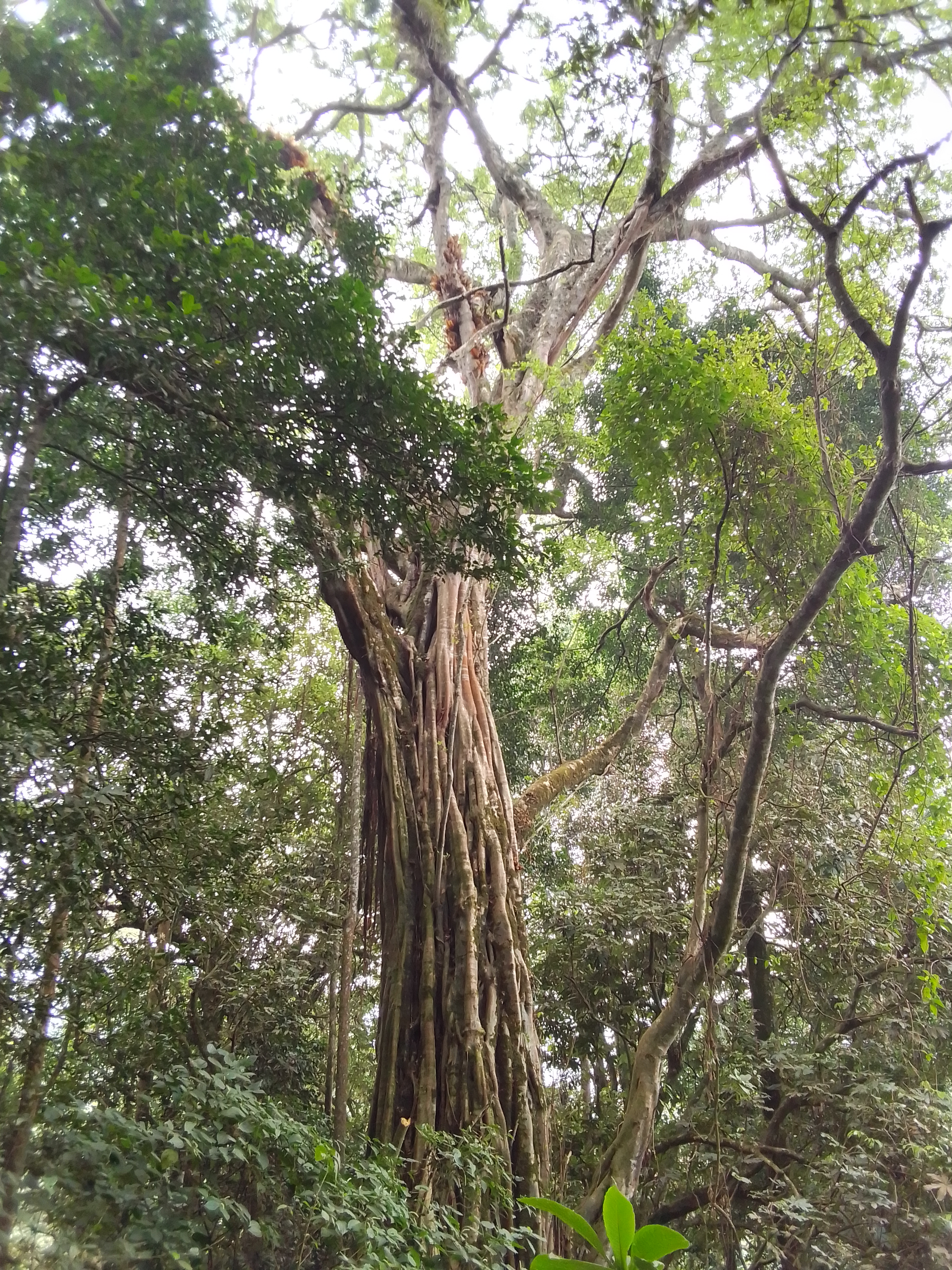
- In Burundi

Conservation status
- Endangered (IUCN 3.1)

Scientific classification
- Kingdom: Plantae
- Clade: Tracheophytes
- Clade: Angiosperms
- Clade: Eudicots
- Order: Santalales
- Family: Loranthaceae
- Genus: Agelanthus
- Species: A. keilii

Binomial name
- Agelanthus keilii (Engl. & K.Krause) Polhill & Wiens

Synonyms
- Loranthus becquetii Balle; Loranthus keilii Engl. & K.Krause; Tapinanthus keilii (Engl. & K.Krause) Danser; Tapinanthus prunifolius subsp. keilii (Engl. & K. Krause) Balle

= Agelanthus keilii =

Species of plant

Agelanthus keilii is a species of hemiparasitic plant in the family Loranthaceae, which is native to Rwanda, Tanzania and Burundi.

== Description ==
A description of the plant is given in Govaerts et al.

== Habitat/ecology ==
A. keilii is found at forest edges and wooded grassland on Ficus, Bridelia, and Combretum, at altitudes of between 1,000 and 1,450 m. Seed is dispersed long distance by means of birds.

== Threats ==
The places in which A. keilii has been found are all unprotected. Its habitat is declining due to conversion of forest edges and grassland for agriculture, and harvesting for firewood.
