= Agelanthus myrsinifolius =

Conservation status
- Vulnerable (IUCN 3.1)

Scientific classification
- Kingdom: Plantae
- Clade: Tracheophytes
- Clade: Angiosperms
- Clade: Eudicots
- Order: Santalales
- Family: Loranthaceae
- Genus: Agelanthus
- Species: A. myrsinifolius

Binomial name
- Agelanthus myrsinifolius (Engl. & K.Krause) Polhill & Wiens

Synonyms
- Loranthus myrsinifolius Engl. & K.Krause; Tapinanthus myrsinifolius (Engl. & K.Krause) Danser; Loranthus myrsinifolius var. humbertii Balle

Species of plant

Agelanthus myrsinifolius is a species of hemiparasitic plant in the family Loranthaceae, which is native to Rwanda, Zaire and Burundi.

== Description ==
For a brief description see the African Plant database.

== Habitat and ecology ==
A. myrsinifolius has been found at altitudes of 1900–3300 m in montane or swamp forests and in heaths. Recorded hosts are Myrsine and Erica mannii (at the higher altitudes).

== Threats ==
At lower altitudes, intense human population pressure means that outside the protected areas, forest is disappearing due to agriculture and logging. At these altitudes, the host, Myrsine, is being cleared for agriculture. At the higher altitudes, the heath, Erica mannii, is probably safe.
