= Agelanthus pennatulus =

Conservation status
- Vulnerable (IUCN 3.1)

Scientific classification
- Kingdom: Plantae
- Clade: Tracheophytes
- Clade: Angiosperms
- Clade: Eudicots
- Order: Santalales
- Family: Loranthaceae
- Genus: Agelanthus
- Species: A. pennatulus

Binomial name
- Agelanthus pennatulus (Sprague) Polhill & Wiens

Species of mistletoe

Agelanthus pennatulus is a species of hemiparasitic plant in the family Loranthaceae, which is found in Tanzania, and Kenya.

== Description ==
A description of the plant is given in Govaerts et al., based on Polhill & Wiens (1999).

== Habitat/ecology ==
A. pennatulus has been found at altitudes of 1650–2400 m in both moist & dry evergreen forests. Recorded hosts are Olea, Strombosia, Maytenus and various Rutaceae.

== Threats ==
The major threat is from forest clearance for agriculture (and forest disturbance).
