= Agelanthus microphyllus =

Conservation status
- Endangered (IUCN 3.1)

Scientific classification
- Kingdom: Plantae
- Clade: Tracheophytes
- Clade: Angiosperms
- Clade: Eudicots
- Order: Santalales
- Family: Loranthaceae
- Genus: Agelanthus
- Species: A. microphyllus

Binomial name
- Agelanthus microphyllus Polhill & Wiens

Species of mistletoe

Agelanthus microphyllus is a species of hemiparasitic plant in the family Loranthaceae, which is native to Ethiopia, Kenya and Tanzania.

== Description ==
A description of the plant is given in Govaerts et al., based on Polhill & Wiens (1999).

== Habitat/ecology ==
A. microphyllus grows on Acacia species in deciduous bushland, and is an extremely scattered and uncommon species.

== Threats ==
The main threat is habitat conversion to agriculture, in particular, to maize plantations.
