= Agelanthus igneus =

Conservation status
- Endangered (IUCN 3.1)

Scientific classification
- Kingdom: Plantae
- Clade: Tracheophytes
- Clade: Angiosperms
- Clade: Eudicots
- Order: Santalales
- Family: Loranthaceae
- Genus: Agelanthus
- Species: A. igneus

Binomial name
- Agelanthus igneus (Danser) Polhill & Wiens

Species of mistletoe

Agelanthus igneus is a species of hemiparasitic plant in the family Loranthaceae, which is native to Mozambique and Tanzania.

== Description ==
A description of the plant is given in Govaerts et al., based on Polhill & Wiens (2006).

== Habitat/ecology ==
A. igneus is found in riverine forest and coastal bushland. Known hosts are Grewia and Combretum.

== Threats ==
In Tanzania the main threat is from agriculture and pine plantations, while in Mozambique the major threat is from tourism development.
