= Agelanthus nyasicus =

Scientific classification
- Kingdom: Plantae
- Clade: Tracheophytes
- Clade: Angiosperms
- Clade: Eudicots
- Order: Santalales
- Family: Loranthaceae
- Genus: Agelanthus
- Species: A. nyasicus

Binomial name
- Agelanthus nyasicus (Baker & Sprague) Polhill & Wiens

Species of plant

Agelanthus nyasicus is a species of hemiparasitic plant in the family Loranthaceae, which is native to Botswana, Malawi, Mozambique, Tanzania, Zambia, Zaïre and Zimbabwe.

== Description ==
For brief descriptions, see the African Plant database and Govaerts et al. (2018) (based on Polhill & Wiens (2006). For an image, see Flora of the World.

== Habitat/ecology ==
Agelanthus nyasicus is found at the edges of montane and riverine forest, generally in the higher-rainfall Brachystegia woodland (or miombo woodlands) at altitudes of 100–1900 m. Common hosts are Ficus, Bridelia and various legumes.
