= Agelanthus validus =

Conservation status
- Endangered (IUCN 3.1)

Scientific classification
- Kingdom: Plantae
- Clade: Tracheophytes
- Clade: Angiosperms
- Clade: Eudicots
- Order: Santalales
- Family: Loranthaceae
- Genus: Agelanthus
- Species: A. validus

Binomial name
- Agelanthus validus Polhill & Wiens

Species of mistletoe

Agelanthus validus is a species of hemiparasitic plant in the family Loranthaceae, which is found in the Usambara Mountains, Tanzania

== Description ==
A description of the plant is given in Govaerts et al., based on Polhill & Wiens (1999).

== Habitat/ecology ==
A. validus parasitises Catha, Maytenus and Scolopia.

== Threats ==
The major threat is habitat conversion for timber and agriculture. Both the quality and extent of its habitat are declining.
