= Agelanthus rondensis =

Conservation status
- Critically endangered, possibly extinct (IUCN 3.1)

Scientific classification
- Kingdom: Plantae
- Clade: Embryophytes
- Clade: Tracheophytes
- Clade: Spermatophytes
- Clade: Angiosperms
- Clade: Eudicots
- Order: Santalales
- Family: Loranthaceae
- Genus: Agelanthus
- Species: A. rondensis

Binomial name
- Agelanthus rondensis (Engl.) Polhill & Wiens

Synonyms
- Loranthus rondensis Engl.; Tapinanthus rondensis (Engl.) Danser

Species of mistletoe

Agelanthus rondensis is a species of hemiparasitic plant in the family Loranthaceae. It is endemic to Tanzania.

This species has been found only on the Rondo Plateau of Lindi Region, Tanzania where the threat is from conversion of habitat for agriculture. There is a continuing decline in the extent and quality of habitat. This species has not been seen since its discovery in 1903 in what is a well-surveyed region. Thus, it is possibly extinct.

No information is available on habitat or host preference.
