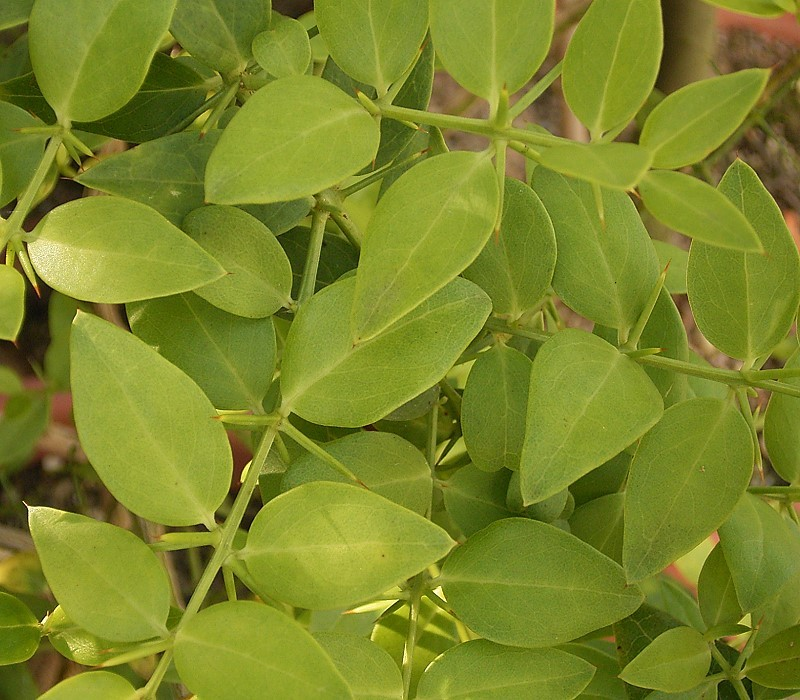
- Azima tetracantha

Scientific classification
- Kingdom: Plantae
- Clade: Tracheophytes
- Clade: Angiosperms
- Clade: Eudicots
- Clade: Rosids
- Order: Brassicales
- Family: Salvadoraceae
- Genus: Azima; Lam.

Species
- 3, see text

Synonyms
- Actegeton Blume; Kandena Raf.; Monetia L'Hér.

= Azima =

Genus of flowering plants

Azima is a genus of flowering plants in the family Salvadoraceae. It includes three species native to tropical and Southern Africa, tropical Asia, and New Guinea.

== Species ==
Three species are accepted.

- Azima angustifolia A.DC.
- Azima sarmentosa (Blume) Benth. & Hook.f.
- Azima tetracantha Lam.
