= Agelanthus longipes =

Conservation status
- Vulnerable (IUCN 3.1)

Scientific classification
- Kingdom: Plantae
- Clade: Tracheophytes
- Clade: Angiosperms
- Clade: Eudicots
- Order: Santalales
- Family: Loranthaceae
- Genus: Agelanthus
- Species: A. longipes

Binomial name
- Agelanthus longipes (Baker & Sprague) Polhill & Wiens

Species of mistletoe

Agelanthus longipes is a species of hemiparasitic plant in the family Loranthaceae, which is found in the Tanzania, Mozambique and Kenya.

== Description ==
A description of the plant is given in Govaerts et al., based on Polhill & Wiens (2006).

== Habitat/ecology ==
A. longipes is found in lowland forests, Acacia woodland and coastal thickets. There is no information about the hosts.

== Threats ==
Its coastal habitat is under threat from habitat conversion for agriculture, tourism infrastructure and urban expansion. In addition, Tanzanian forest reserves lack effective protection.
