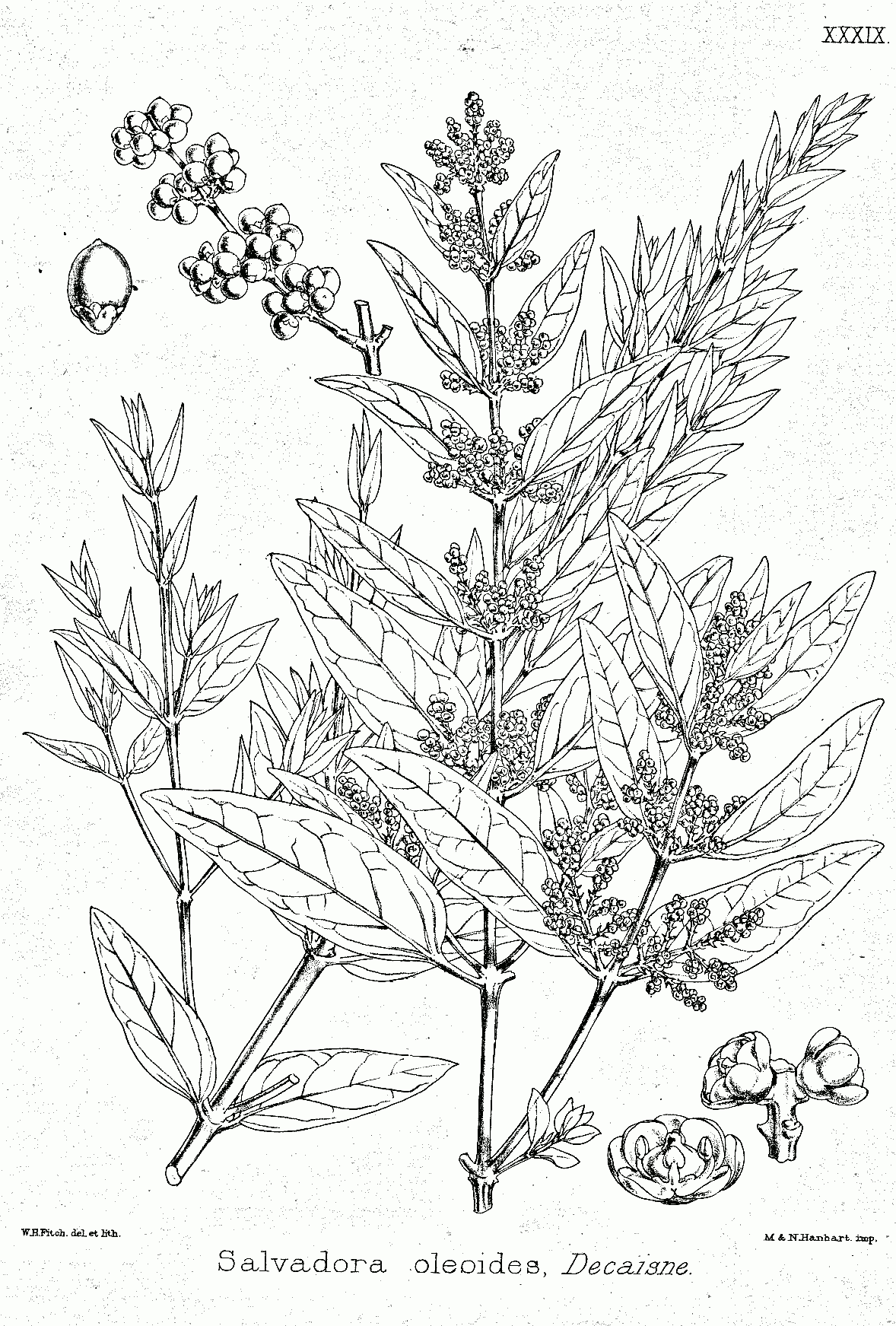

Conservation status
- Data Deficient (IUCN 3.1)

Scientific classification
- Kingdom: Plantae
- Clade: Tracheophytes
- Clade: Angiosperms
- Clade: Eudicots
- Clade: Rosids
- Order: Brassicales
- Family: Salvadoraceae
- Genus: Salvadora
- Species: S. oleoides

Binomial name
- Salvadora oleoides Decne.

Synonyms
- Salvadora stocksii Wight

= Salvadora oleoides =

Species of plant

Salvadora oleoides is a small bushy evergreen tree found in India and Pakistan and southern Iran. Its common name is Vann or (Large) Toothbrush Tree.

The root and stem possess various antimicrobial agents and is traditionally used as toothbrush in Pakistan and India.

== Habitat ==
The vann is commonly found in and around Sandal Bar, and is reserved for use as grazing sources for local peasant villages. In addition, a number of trees have been preserved to provide shade for cattle.

== Wood ==
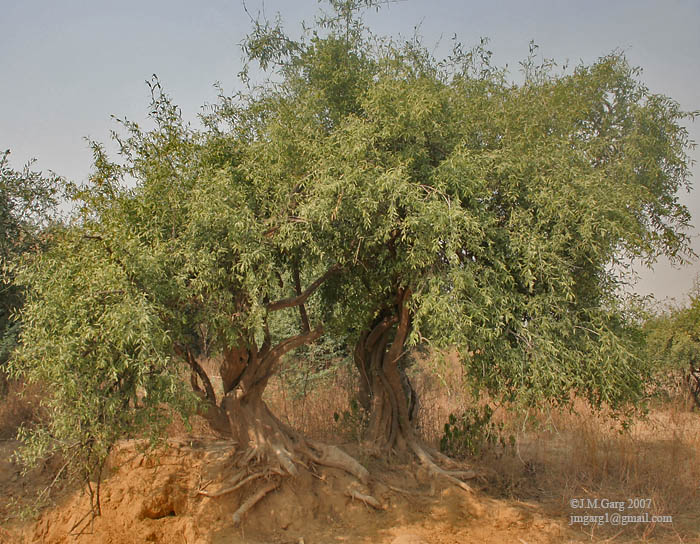
tree at Hodal in Faridabad District of Haryana, India.

The vann is mostly non-woody and the small amount of wood that it has is soft, light, and not particularly useful for any of wood's normal uses, notably building and heat. When burnt, it leaves a large quantity of ash, which can then be boiled down into a substance for treating mange in camels.

== In literature ==
=== Jal-tree ===
In the janamsakhis of Guru Nanak, he was found laying under a jal-tree whose shadow remained stationary to protect him from the sun. Macauliffe identifies this tree as Salvadora oleoides.

== See also ==
- "Pilu" is a Proto Dravidian word named after tooth word "Pal" for indicating tooth word
- Pīlu - Mentioned in Mahābhārata.
- Salvadora persica—Toothbrush tree, peelu, or siwak
