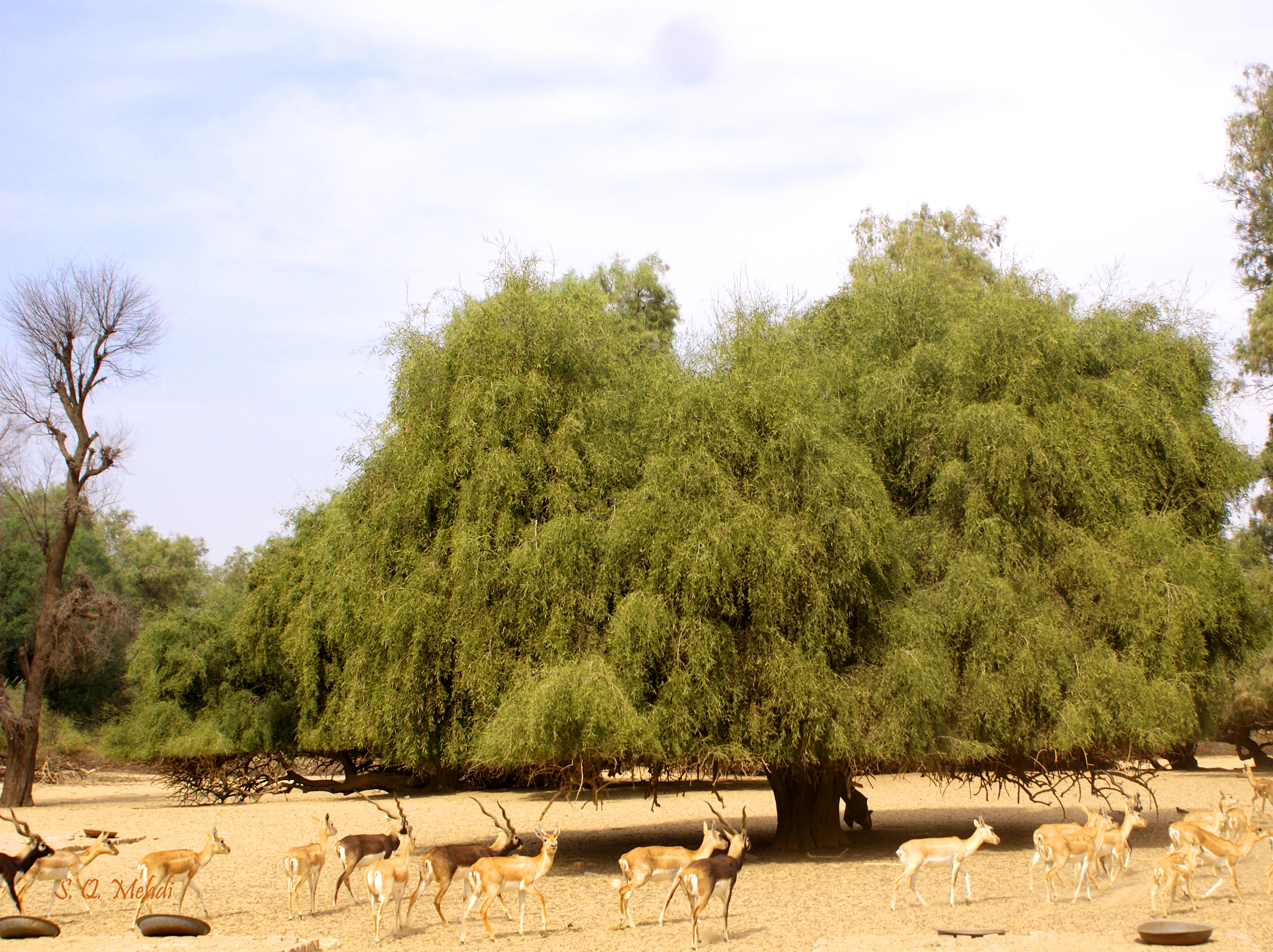

Conservation status
- Least Concern (IUCN 3.1)

Scientific classification
- Kingdom: Plantae
- Clade: Embryophytes
- Clade: Tracheophytes
- Clade: Angiosperms
- Clade: Eudicots
- Clade: Rosids
- Order: Brassicales
- Family: Salvadoraceae
- Genus: Salvadora
- Species: S. persica

Binomial name
- Salvadora persica L.

= Salvadora persica =

Species of shrub

Salvadora persica or the arak, is a small evergreen tree. Other common names include jhal, toothbrush tree, mustard tree, and peelu. Its roots and twigs called miswak are traditionally used for chewing as a toothbrush.

The tree is native from the Middle East and North Africa to India.

== Description ==
Salvadora persica is a small tree or shrub with a crooked trunk, typically 6–7 metres (20–23 ft) in height. Its bark is scabrous and cracked, whitish with pendulous extremities. The root bark of the tree is similar in colour to sand, and the inner surfaces are an even lighter shade of brown. It has a pleasant fragrance, of cress or mustard, as well as a warm and pungent taste.

The tree produces small red fruit, edible and juicy but pungent, in clusters, and its dark green leaves are round and fleshy.

== Etymology and common names ==
The genus was named by the French botanist, Laurent Garcin, in 1749 after a Spanish apothecary, Juan Salvador y Bosca. The type specimen was collected in Persia, giving the species name persica.

Salvadora persica is commonly known as arak, toothbrush tree, or mustard tree, and has various other names in different languages, such as jhal.

== Distribution and ecology ==
The plant is native to the Middle East, North Africa, and India, and is found on desert floodplains, riverbanks, and grassy savannahs. It has high tolerance for salty soils and can tolerate as little as 200 millimetres (8 inches) or less of mean annual rainfall, but it prefers ready access to groundwater. The fruit is eaten by birds, particularly the grey hypocolius, which disperse the seeds.

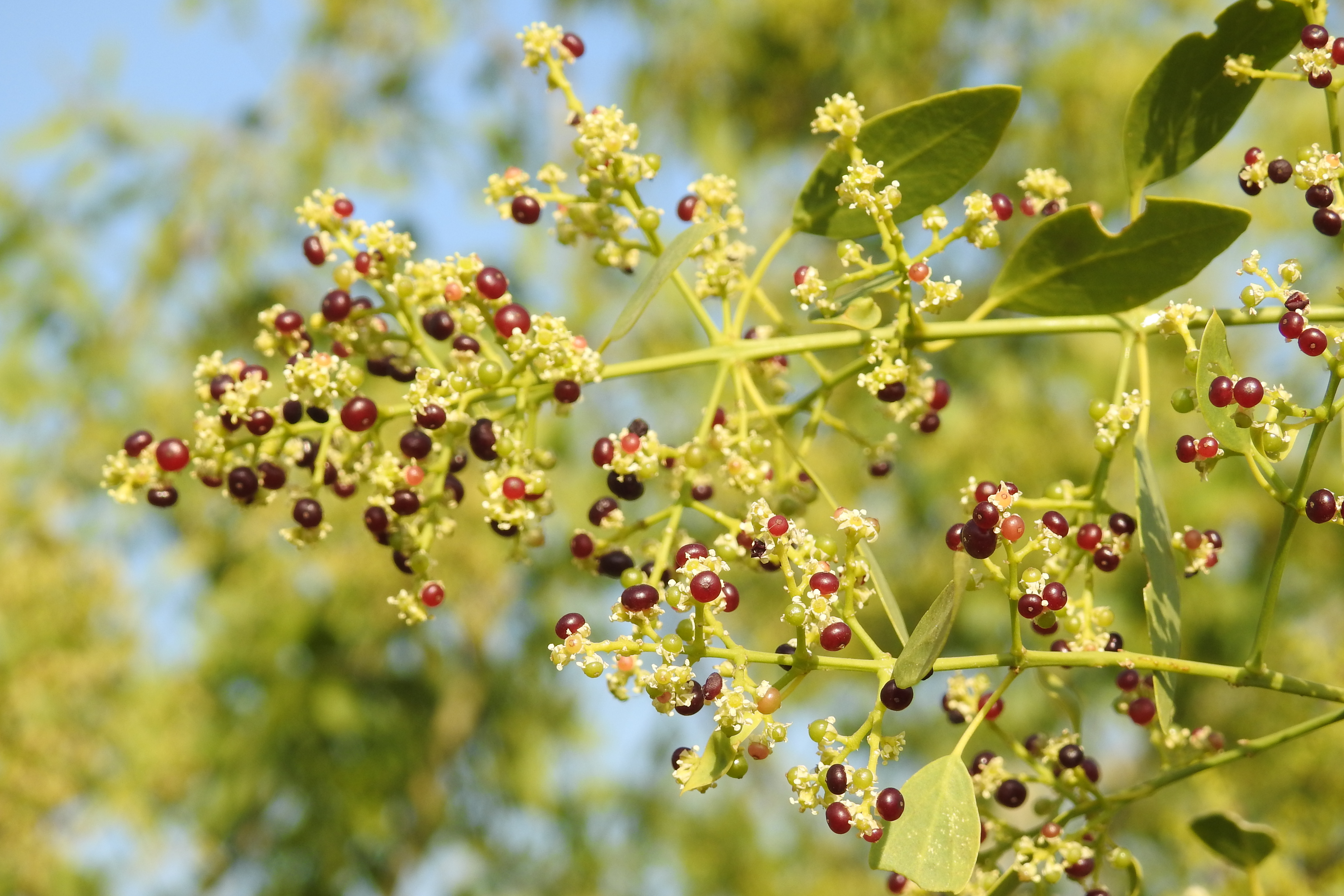
Shrub with berries

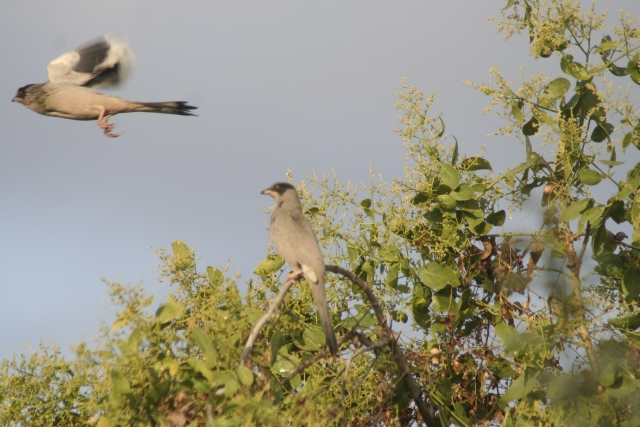
Shrub in India

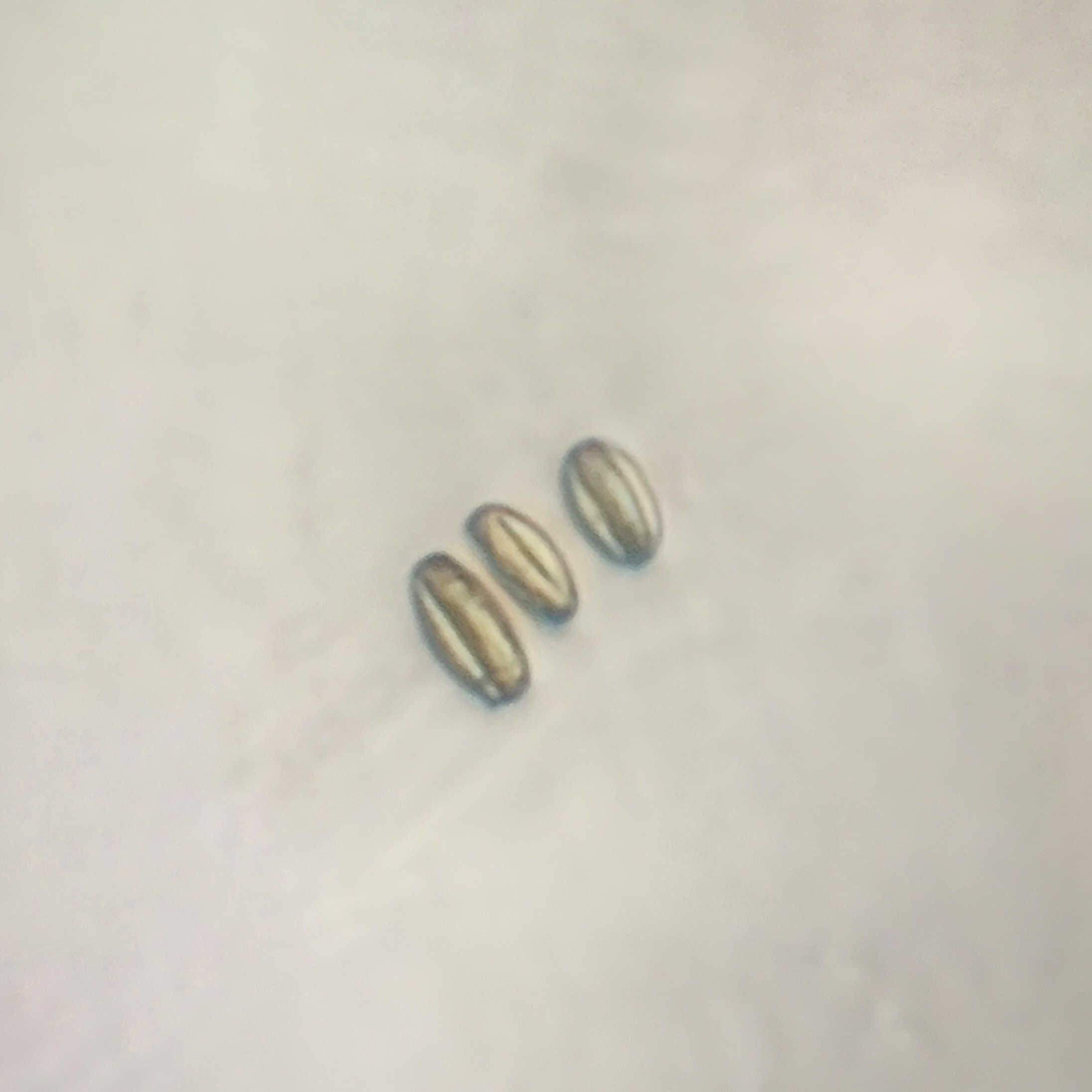
Pollen grains

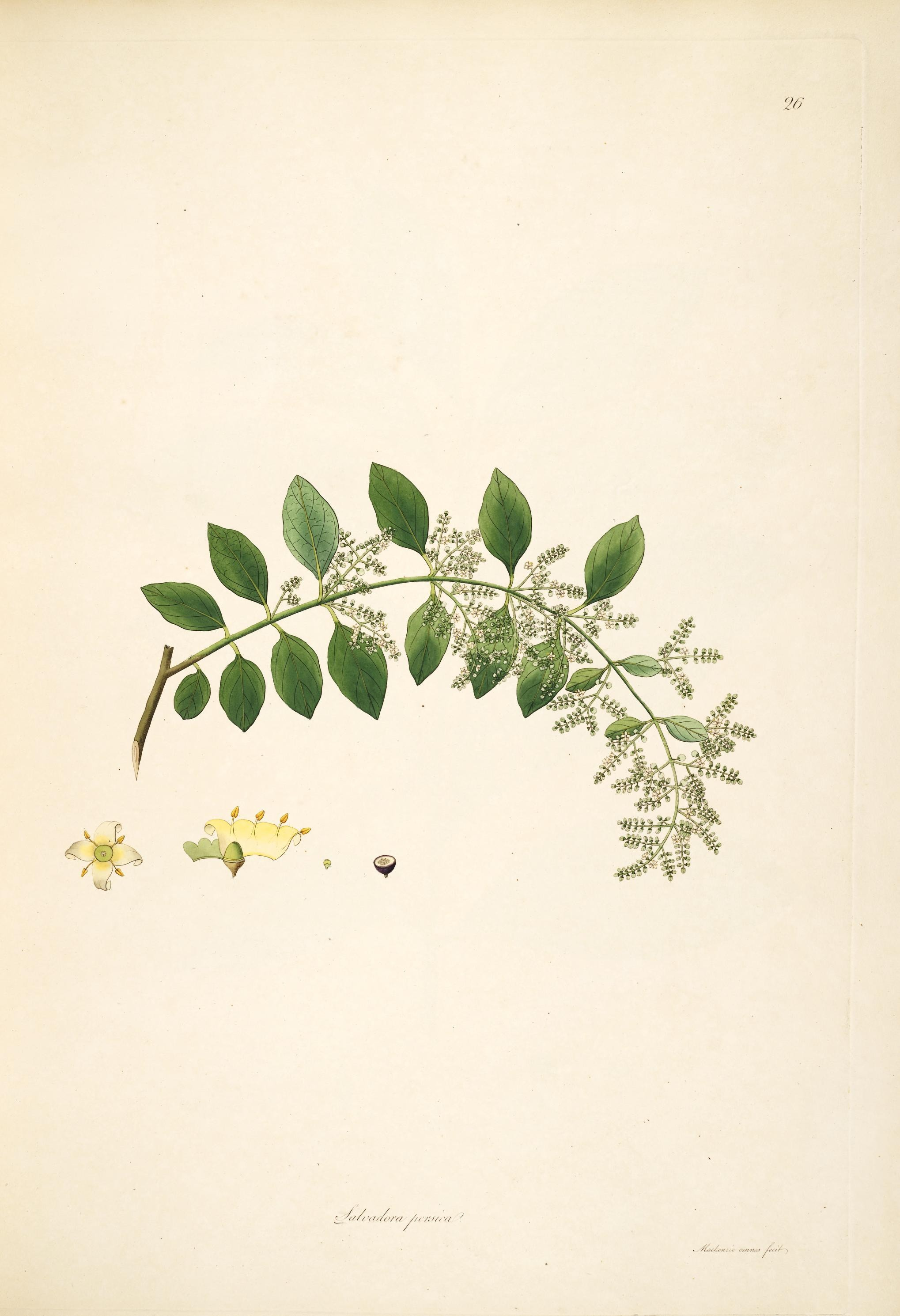

== History and use ==
Salvadora persica stick, widely known as miswak, is used for teeth cleaning throughout the Arabian Peninsula, Iranian Plateau, and wider Muslim world.

Toothbrushes made from roots and small branches of about 3–5 mm diameter have been used for over 1000 years, especially by Islamic populations in India, Arabia and Africa. Several agents occurring in the bark and wood have been suggested as aids in prevention of dental caries [cavities], such as antimicrobial agents that suppress bacterial growth and the formation of plaque.

The fresh leaves can be eaten as part of a salad and are used in traditional medicine. The flowers are small and fragrant and are used as a stimulant and are mildly purgative. The berries are small and barely noticeable; they are eaten both fresh and dried. The wood can be used for charcoal and firewood. In Namibia, the mustard bush is used as drought-resistant fodder for cattle. The seeds can be used to extract a detergent oil.

As of 2009, Botanic Gardens Conservation International has a total of eight Salvadora persica plants in conservation.

== See also ==
- Miswak
- Meswak
- Pilu oil
