= Agelanthus uhehensis =

Conservation status
- Endangered (IUCN 3.1)

Scientific classification
- Kingdom: Plantae
- Clade: Tracheophytes
- Clade: Angiosperms
- Clade: Eudicots
- Order: Santalales
- Family: Loranthaceae
- Genus: Agelanthus
- Species: A. uhehensis

Binomial name
- Agelanthus uhehensis (Engl.) Polhill & Wiens

Synonyms
- Loranthus uhehensis Engl.; Tapinanthus uhehensis (Engl.) Danser

Species of mistletoe

Agelanthus uhehensis is a species of hemiparasitic plant in the family Loranthaceae, which is native to Tanzania.

== Description ==
A description of the plant is given in Govaerts et al., based on Polhill & Wiens (1999).

== Habitat/ecology ==
A. uhehensis commonly parasitises Bridelia on forest edges. It also parasitises Ficus.

== Threats ==
The major threat is habitat conversion to agriculture. However it has been found in some tea estates where the forests are protected.
