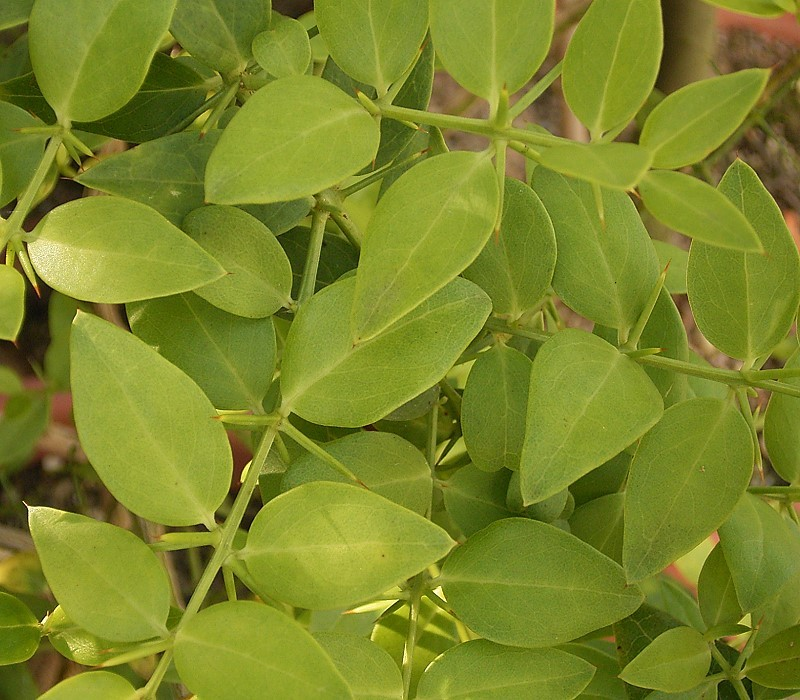

Scientific classification
- Kingdom: Plantae
- Clade: Tracheophytes
- Clade: Angiosperms
- Clade: Eudicots
- Clade: Rosids
- Order: Brassicales
- Family: Salvadoraceae
- Genus: Azima
- Species: A. tetracantha

Binomial name
- Azima tetracantha Lam.

= Azima tetracantha =

Species of flowering plant

Azima tetracantha (syn. Monetia barlerioides L'Her.) is an ornamental plant in the Salvadoraceae family. Common Name: Bee Sting Bush. This plant is commonly known as 'Yashankala' in ayurveda. Its foliage is an important medicine for post-pregnancy treatments, the same is also used for 'karkidaka treatments' which is famous in Kerala.
