= Dobera =

Scientific classification
- Kingdom: Plantae
- Clade: Tracheophytes
- Clade: Angiosperms
- Clade: Eudicots
- Clade: Rosids
- Order: Brassicales
- Family: Salvadoraceae
- Genus: Dobera; Juss.

Genus of plants

Dobera is a genus of flowering plants belonging to the family Salvadoraceae.

Its native range is Eritrea to Mozambique, Arabian Peninsula, Western India.

Species:

- Dobera glabra (Forssk.) Juss. ex Poir.
- Dobera loranthifolia (Warb.) Harms
