= Agelanthus atrocoronatus =

Conservation status
- Endangered (IUCN 3.1)

Scientific classification
- Kingdom: Plantae
- Clade: Tracheophytes
- Clade: Angiosperms
- Clade: Eudicots
- Order: Santalales
- Family: Loranthaceae
- Genus: Agelanthus
- Species: A. atrocoronatus

Binomial name
- Agelanthus atrocoronatus Polhill & Wiens

Species of mistletoe

Agelanthus atrocoronatus is a species of hemiparasitic plant in the family Loranthaceae. It is endemic to Tanzania. It is known only from the Mufindi Plateau in Tanzania, and was last collected in the 1980s.

== Habitat/ecology ==
A. atrocoronatus is parasitic on various hosts including Vitaceae (the wine-grape family), is bird pollinated, and found in grassland and at the edges of montane forest.

== Threats & conservation efforts ==
The major threats to this species are from urban expansion, and from the exploitation of the trees which host it. Conservation efforts center on local tea estates which currently afford protection to the forests remaining within them.
