= Phragmanthera =

Scientific classification
- Kingdom: Plantae
- Clade: Tracheophytes
- Clade: Angiosperms
- Clade: Eudicots
- Order: Santalales
- Family: Loranthaceae
- Genus: Phragmanthera; Tiegh. 1895

Genus of mistletoes

Phragmanthera is a genus of plants in the family Loranthaceae, the showy mistletoes. It is native to Africa and temperate Asia. The genus contains 35 species.
