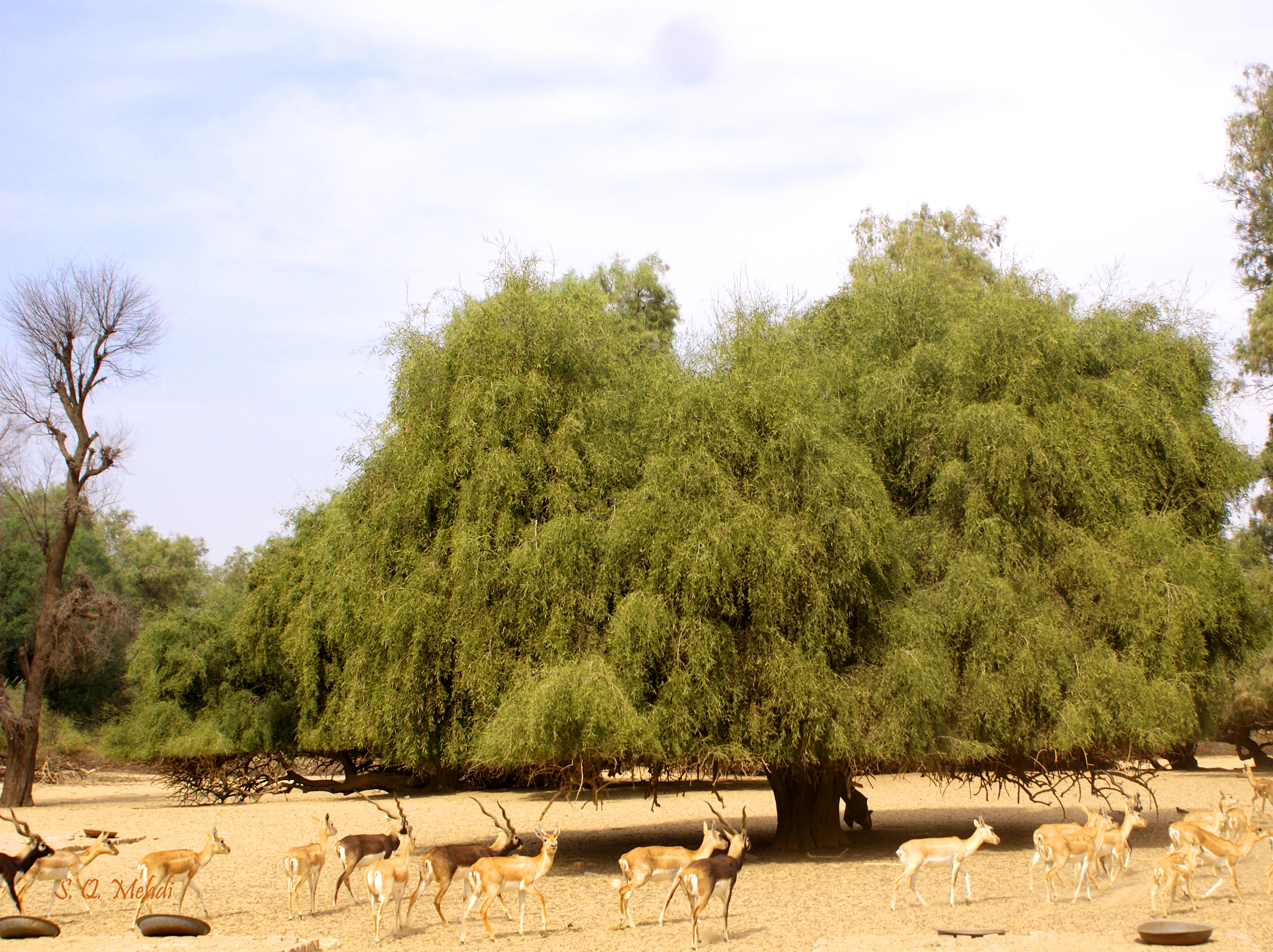
- Salvadora persica

Scientific classification
- Kingdom: Plantae
- Clade: Tracheophytes
- Clade: Angiosperms
- Clade: Eudicots
- Clade: Rosids
- Order: Brassicales
- Family: Salvadoraceae
- Genus: Salvadora; L.

= Salvadora (plant) =

Genus of flowering plants

Salvadora is a genus of flowering plants in the family Salvadoraceae.

Species include:

- Salvadora alii
- Salvadora angustifolia
- Salvadora australis
- Salvadora oleoides
- Salvadora persica

== Sources ==
- The Establishment of a New Genus of Plants, Called Salvadora, with Its Description. By L. Garcin of Neufchatel in Switzerland; Communicated in a Letter to Dr. Mortimer Secr. R. S Garcin, L. Philosophical Transactions.. (1683-1775). 1753-01-01. 46:47–53
