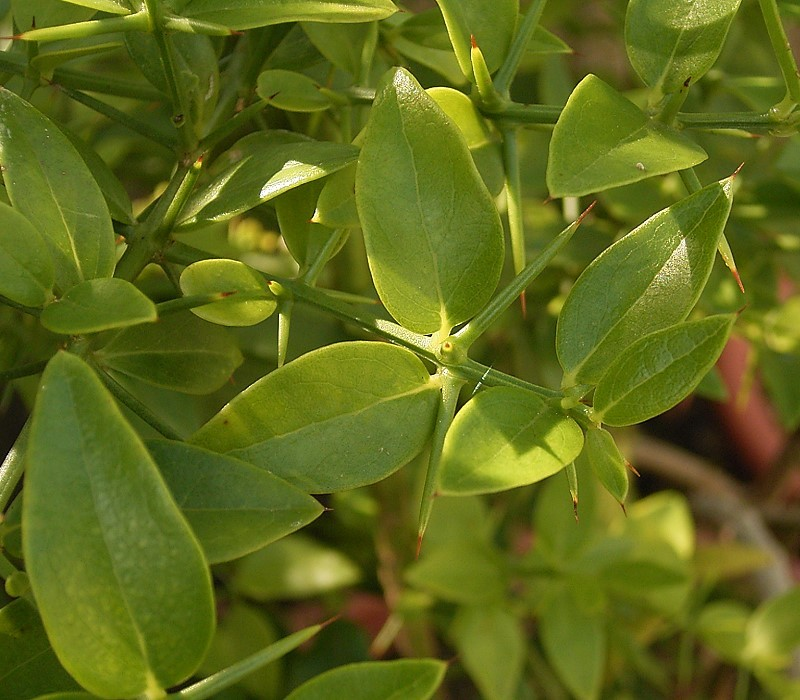
- Azima tetracantha

Scientific classification
- Kingdom: Plantae
- Clade: Tracheophytes
- Clade: Angiosperms
- Clade: Eudicots
- Clade: Rosids
- Order: Brassicales
- Family: Salvadoraceae; Lindl.

Genera
- Azima; Dobera; Salvadora

= Salvadoraceae =

Family of flowering plants

Salvadoraceae is a family in the plant order Brassicales, consisting of three genera with a total of 11 known species. They occur in Africa (including Madagascar), Southeast Asia, and on Java, suggesting they are probably found in much of Malesia. They are often found in hot, dry areas.

Salvadoraceae was previously placed in order Celastrales, but is now placed in Brassicales.

== Genera ==
- Azima
- Dobera
- Salvadora (toothbrush tree)

== See also ==
- Pilu oil
