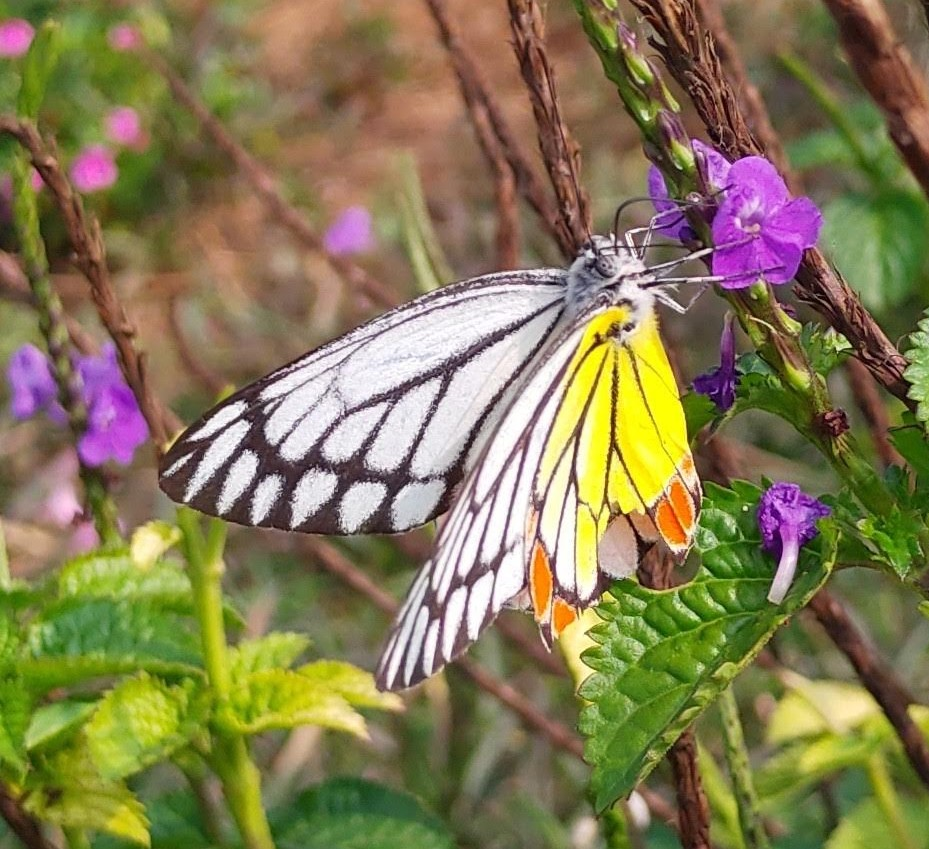

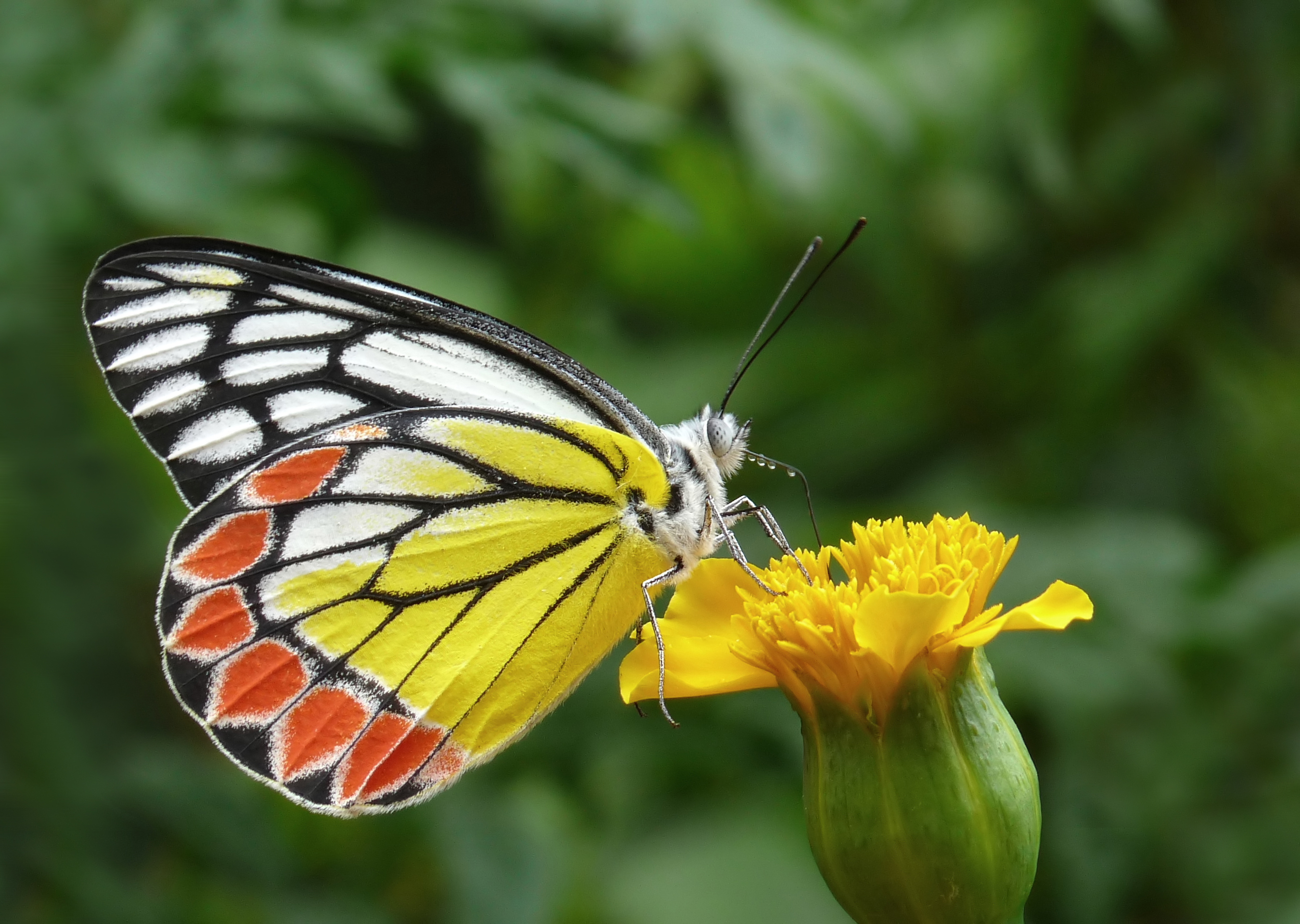

Scientific classification
- Kingdom: Animalia
- Phylum: Arthropoda
- Class: Insecta
- Order: Lepidoptera
- Family: Pieridae
- Genus: Delias
- Species: D. eucharis

Binomial name
- Delias eucharis (Drury, 1773)

Synonyms
- Papilio eucharis Drury, 1773

= Delias eucharis =

Common Jezebel

Species of butterfly

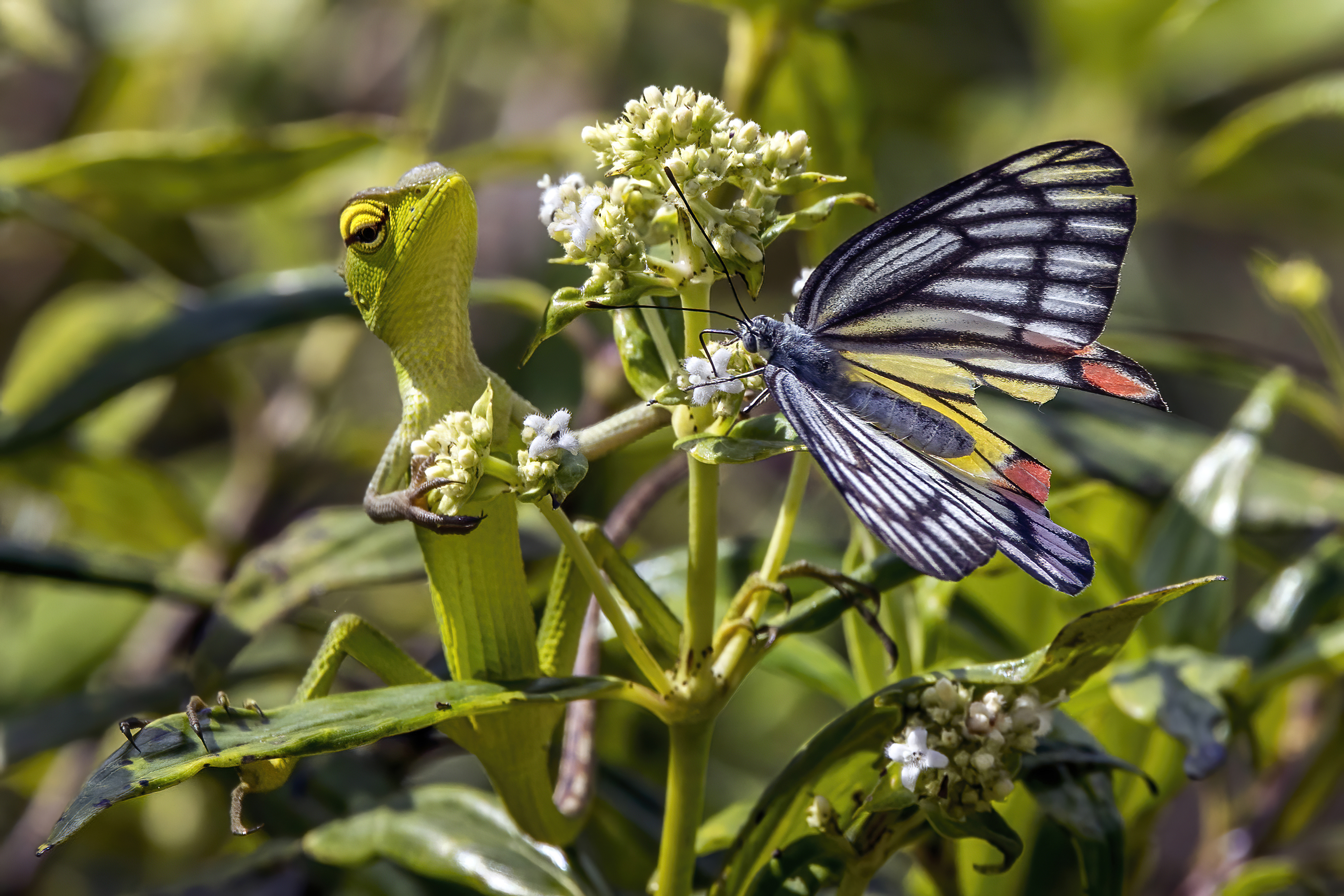
predator lizard

Delias eucharis, the common Jezebel, is a medium-sized pierid butterfly found in many areas of south and southeast Asia, especially in the non-arid regions of India, Bangladesh, Sri Lanka, Indonesia, Myanmar and Thailand. The common Jezebel is one of the most common of the approximately 225 described species in the genus Delias.

== Description ==
The wingspan of both males and females ranges from 6.5 to 8.5 cm.

=== Male ===
Upperside is white. The forewings have the veins broadly black, this colour broadened triangularly at the termination of the veins, costal margin narrowly black; a broad black postdiscal transverse band from costa to dorsum sloped obliquely outwards from costa to vein 4, thence parallel to termen. Hindwing with the veins similar but for three-fourths of their length much more narrowly black; a postdiscal transverse black band as on the forewing but much narrower, curved and extended only between veins 2 and 6; beyond this the veins are more broadly black and this colour as on the forewing broadens out triangularly at the termination of the veins; the interspaces beyond the postdiscal black band pink, due to the vermilion colouration of the underside showing through.

On the underside, the forewings are similar but the black edging to the veins much broader, the upper two interspaces beyond the postdiscal transverse band tinged with yellow. Hindwing: ground colour bright yellow, the veins and transverse postdiscal band as on the upperside but much more broadly black, the latter extended from the costa to vein 2; the interspaces between the veins beyond the postdiscal fascia with a series of broadly lanceolate (lance-shaped) or cone-shaped vermilion-red spots, each spot very narrowly edged with white; the basal portion of interspace 6 white, in contrast to the bright yellow of the ground colour. Antenna black; head, thorax and abdomen white, the apical joint of the palpi black; the head and thorax with a mixture of black hairs that give these parts a grey-blue appearance.

=== Female ===
Upper and undersides similar to those in the male, but the black edging to the veins and the postdiscal transverse bands on both forewings and hindwings are much broader.

== Range and habits ==
The common Jezebel are nomadic in behaviour and are found in a variety of environment including, but not limited to, temperate hill forests, tropical rainforests, dry open woodlands, and beach hinterlands. They are generally found all over India, except in the desert tracts, and up to an altitude of 7,000 feet (2,100 m) in the hills. The butterfly may be found wherever there are trees, even in towns and cities, flying high among the trees and visiting flowers.

It is also commonly seen in gardens. The females can be seen flying amongst the trees in search of its food plants, while the males are more frequently observed visiting flowers for nectar. It rests with its wings closed exhibiting the brilliantly coloured underside.

The Jezebel often flies high up in the canopy and usually comes lower down only to feed on nectar in flowers. Due to this habit apparently, it has evolved a dull upperside and a brilliant underside so that birds below it recognise it immediately while in flight and at rest.

== Protection ==
It has bright colouration to indicate the fact that it is unpalatable due to toxins accumulated by the larvae from the host plants.

Like other unpalatable butterflies the common Jezebel is mimicked by Prioneris sita, the painted sawtooth. The common Jezebel can be distinguished by the shape of the orange red spots on the hindwing. In the painted sawtooth these spots are very squarish whereas in the common Jezebel they are more arrow head shaped. The painted sawtooth also flies faster and will also mudpuddle.

== Life cycle ==
The Jezebel breeds all year round.

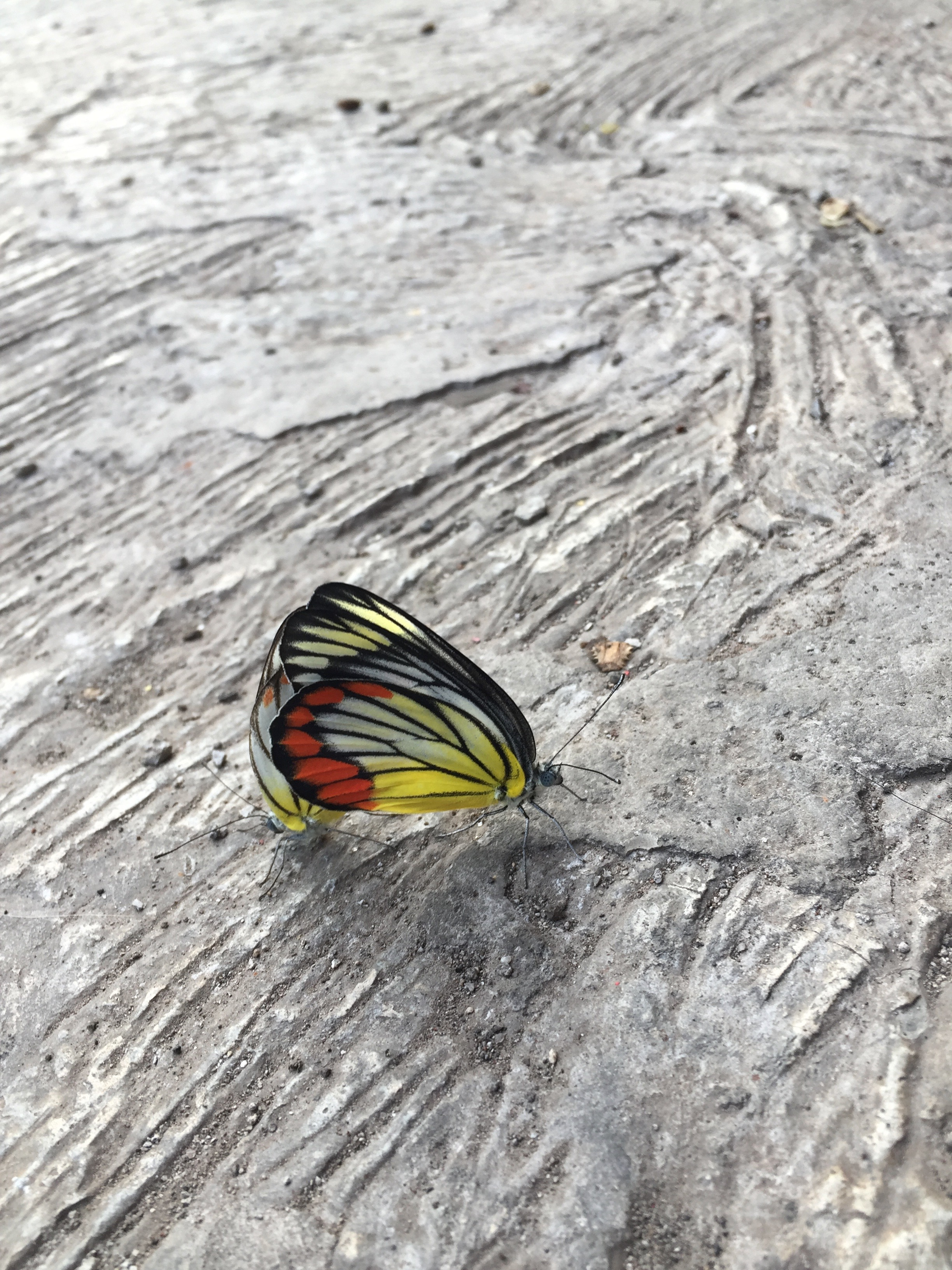
mating

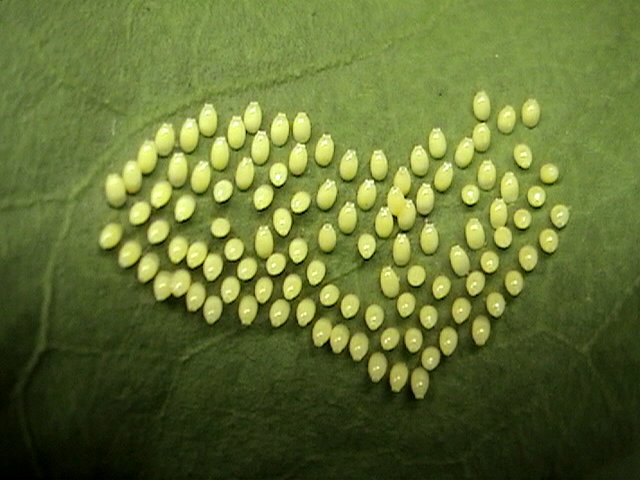
Eggs

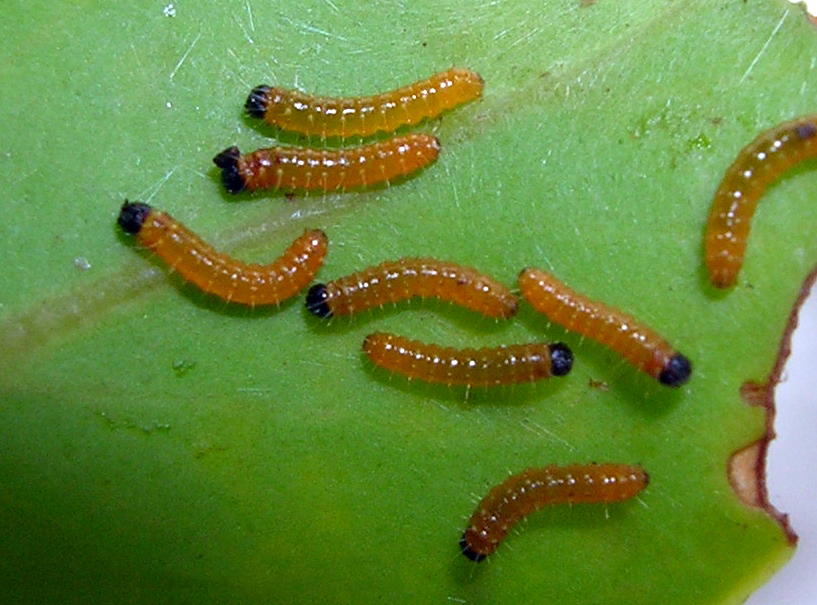
Caterpillar

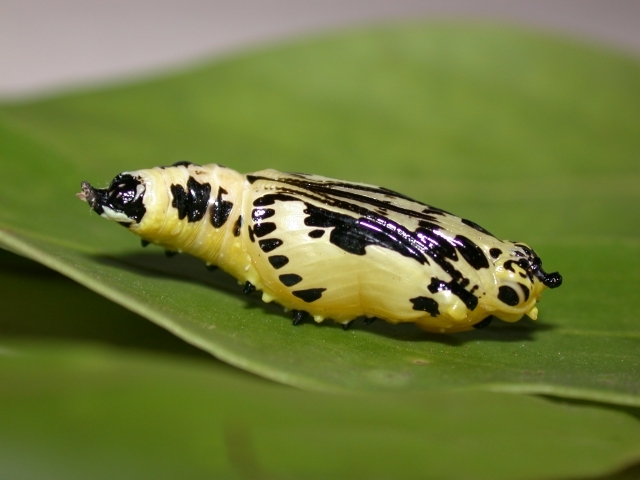
Chrysalis

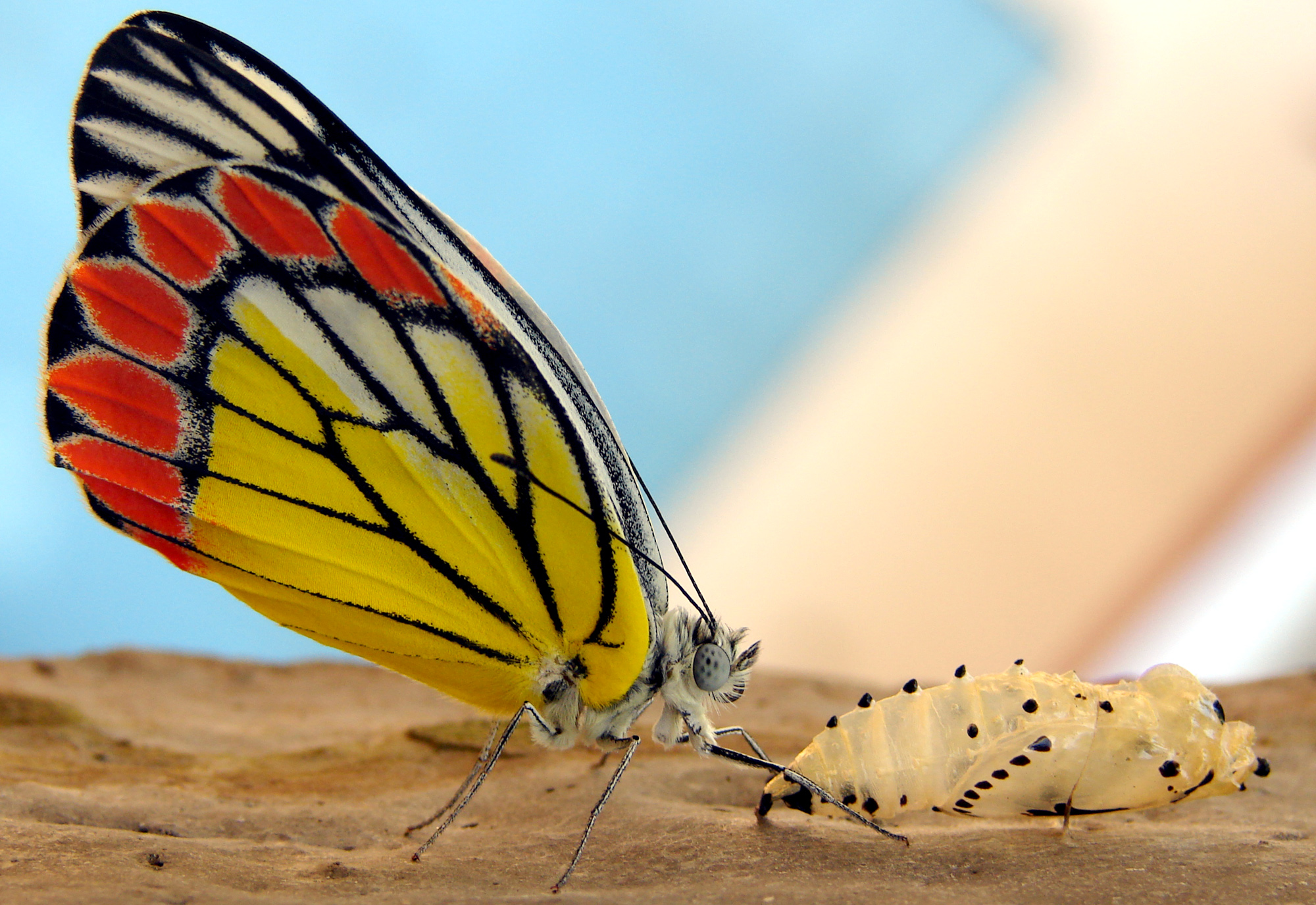
having emerged from chrysalis

=== Larva ===
The caterpillars are gregarious in the first few instars. Caterpillars are yellow brown with a black head and have white tubercules from which long white hair arise.

"Long, cylindrical and smooth with an oily gloss. Two subdorsal rows of long white bristles springing from minute white tubercles; head, sides and back sparsely clothed with short white bristles: colour brown, head and feet black. It may be found from the beginning of August everywhere on the common 'mistletoe' (Loranthus), from which it will drop and hang by a thread if the tree is shaken. We have never found it feeding on anything else. Unlike most butterflies this species lays as many as twenty or thirty eggs on one leaf, in parallel rows, with equal intervals, and the larvae continue in some measure gregarious to the last, so that a large number of pupae are often found, at a little distance from each other, on a wall, or the trunk of a tree."

When born, they first make a meal of their eggshell and wander off to the nearest leaf-margin where they devour the leaf, side by side, and then move on to the next one. Leaf after leaf is collectively devoured by this group till they pass through the first few instars of the larval stage. However growth amongst these caterpillars is not even due to the varying amount of food that each is able to get. Accordingly, their development is staggered, they pupate only when they are ready and the brood emerges over a period of time. The larva is not very lively. When disturbed, it drops off the leaf by a silken thread.

=== Pupa ===
"Closely attached by the tail and by a band generally to a vertical surface with the head upwards. It is moderately stout with a short snout, two small tubercles on the head, a sharp but not prominent dorsal ridge on the thorax, continued in a row of tubercles on the abdominal segments. Below these are two partial subdorsal rows. Colour bright yellow; tubercles and a row of spots defining the wing-cases black." "Large numbers are destroyed by a dipterous parasite very like a common house-fly." (Davidson and Aitken) The chrysalis is bright yellow coloured. It is marked with black spots and lines. It is attached to the underside of a leaf or branch or any other suitable surface by a strong tail pad and a tight body band.

== Food plants ==
The larval plants are various species of parasitic mistletoes such as Loranthus, small shrubs that grow on the branches of trees. This butterfly's ability to form dense aggregations as caterpillars and to feed on Loranthus has led to suggestions that they could be used for control of these mistletoes. The larva has been recorded on Butea monosperma, Dendrophthoe falcata, Dendrophthoe glabrescens, Loranthus, Loranthus cordifolius, Helicanthes elasticus, Loranthus longiflorus, Scurrula parasitica, Taxillus vestitus, Abelmoschus moschatus, Pterospermum acerifolium and Viscum album.

== See also ==
- Pieridae
- List of butterflies of India
- List of butterflies of India (Pieridae)
