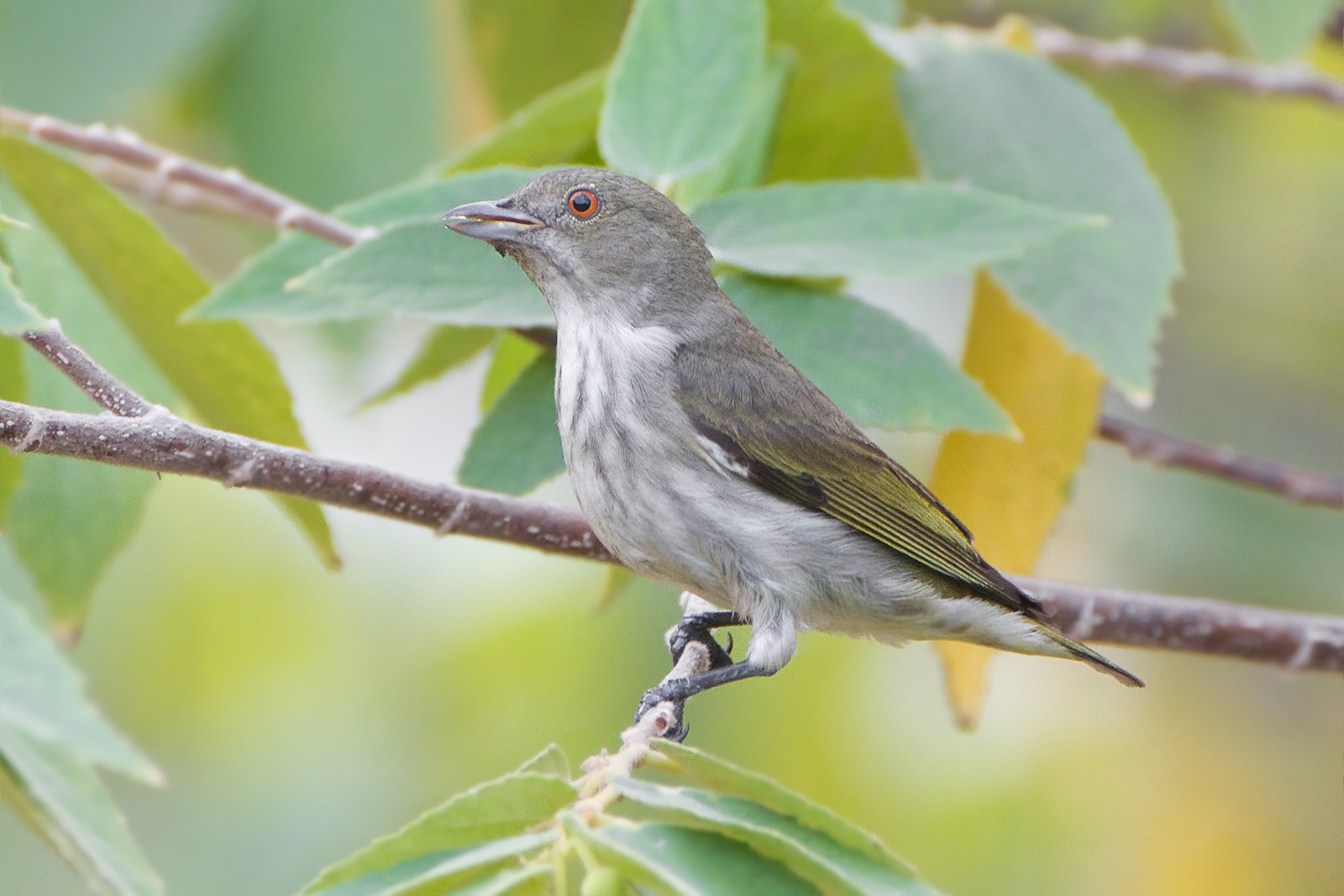
- D. a. modestum from Kaeng Krachan, Phetchaburi, Thailand Calls of D. a. agile

Conservation status
- Least Concern (IUCN 3.1)

Scientific classification
- Kingdom: Animalia
- Phylum: Chordata
- Class: Aves
- Order: Passeriformes
- Family: Dicaeidae
- Genus: Pachyglossa
- Species: P. agilis

Binomial name
- Pachyglossa agilis (Tickell, 1833)

Synonyms
- Piprisoma squalidum Dicaeum agile

= Thick-billed flowerpecker =

Species of bird

The thick-billed flowerpecker (Pachyglossa agilis) is a tiny bird in the flowerpecker group. They feed predominantly on fruits and are active birds that are mainly seen in the tops of trees in forests. It is a resident bird with a wide distribution across tropical southern Asia from India east to Indonesia and Timor with several populations recognized as subspecies some of which are sometimes treated as full species. This species was formerly placed in the genus Dicaeum.

== Taxonomy ==
The thick-billed flowerpecker was formally described in 1833 by the English ornithologist Samuel Tickell based on a specimen collected in the Barabhum and Dhalbhum forests of the state of Jharkhand in eastern India. He placed the new species with the finches in the genus Fringilla and coined the binomial name Fringilla agilis. The specific epithet is Latin meaning "nimble" or "active". The thick-billed flowerpecker was formerly placed in the genus Dicaeum but when molecular phylogenetic studies found that this genus was paraphyletic, several species including the thick-billed flowerpecker were moved to the resurrected genus Pachyglossa that had been introduced in 1843 by Edward Blyth.

Eleven subspecies are recognised:

- P. a. agilis (Tickell, 1833) – northeast Pakistan and peninsular India
- P. a. zeylonica (Whistler, 1944) – Sri Lanka
- P. a. pallescens (Riley, 1935) – Bangladesh to Myanmar, north Thailand, and north Vietnam
- P. a. modesta (Hume, 1875) – south peninsular Thailand, Malay Peninsula, and Borneo
- P. a. atjehensis (Delacour, 1946) – Sumatra
- P. a. finschi (Bartels, MEG, 1914) – Java (rare)
- P. a. tincta (Mayr, 1944) – Sumba and Flores to Alor Island (central Lesser Sunda Islands)
- P. a. obsoleta (Müller, S, 1843) – Timor and Wetar (east Lesser Sunda Islands)
- P. a. striatissima Parkes, 1962 – Luzon group (north Philippines)
- P. a. aeruginosa (Bourns & Worcester, 1894) – Mindoro, West Visayas and Mindanao (south Philippines)
- P. a. affinis (Zimmer, JT, 1919) – Palawan (southwest Philippines)

The subspecies P. a. aeruginosa, P. a. striatissima and P. a. affinis have sometimes been considered as a separate species, the striped flowerpecker.

== Description ==
This species flowerpecker is about 10 cm long and has a dark stout beak and short tail. They are dark grey brown above and dull greyish with diffuse streaking on light buffy underparts. The rump is slightly more olive in the nominate race. The bill is dark, somewhat stout and heavy and the iris is reddish. The sexes are not distinguishable in the field and the juvenile has a paler base to the mandible and less streaks on the underside. There are whitish spots at the tip of the tail feathers. The nominate race is found on the plains of the mainland of the Indian Subcontinent. The Sri Lankan population, zeylonense (=zeylonicum, zeylonica), is smaller and darker above. and Subspecies modestum (including pallescens) is found in northeastern India and extends into Burma. Several island forms have been described but some of them are only tentatively kept within this species. These include atjehense of Sumatra, finschi of western Java, tinctum of Sumba, Flores and Alor, obsoletum from Timor, striatissimum, aeruginosum and affine from the Philippines. Several of these such as aeruginosum are considered as full species as they are reproductively isolated and distinct in morphology.

== Behaviour and ecology ==
Like other flowerpeckers they feed mainly on berries, nectar but sometimes take insects. Many of the subspecies are found in dense lowland forests with the exception of the nominate race which is found mainly in cultivated areas or open forest.

Unlike the pale-billed flowerpecker, it does not swallow the berries of Loranthus (some species now in genus Dendrophthoe) and instead wipes the seeds on a branch and feeds on the epicarp. This makes it disperse the parasitic mistletoe locally unlike the other species. In Sri Lanka, they forage at a greater height in the canopy than the pale-billed flowerpecker.

Foraging birds produce a spick call frequently and the tail is jerked from side to side when perched. When displaying the male twitters and flutters over the female. The song is rambling and is mixed with notes that resemble that of the ashy prinia. The feathers of the crown are erected in display and the white bases of the feathers become visible as a crown stripe.

The nest has been described as appearing camouflaged like a dry leaf. It is a pendant purse like structure made of cobwebs or fine plant fibres and is located from 3 to 15 metres high suspended from a thin horizontal branch. Said to frequently nest among the nests of Oecophylla smaragdina ants. The breeding season in southern India is December to March. Both male and female participate in nest building. The usual clutch is about 3 eggs but can vary from 2 to 4. The incubation period is around 13 days and the chick takes around 18 days to fledge.

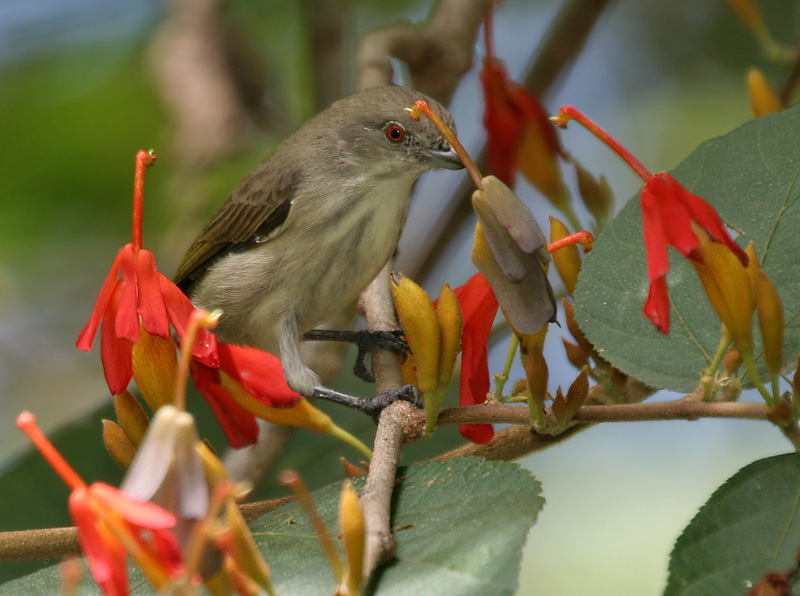
Dicaeum agile agile on Helicteres isora in Narsapur, India.

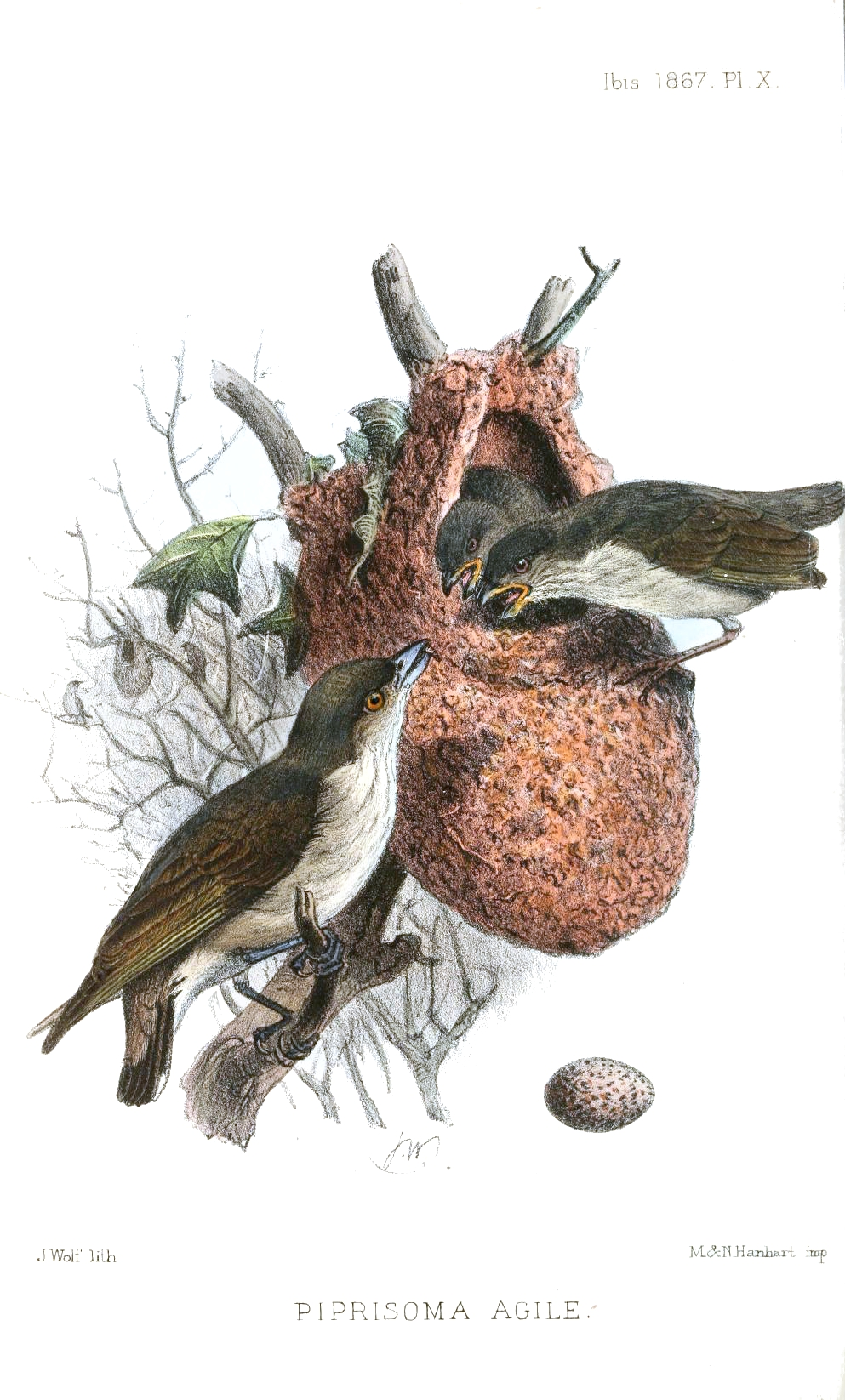
Illustration of nest by Joseph Wolf

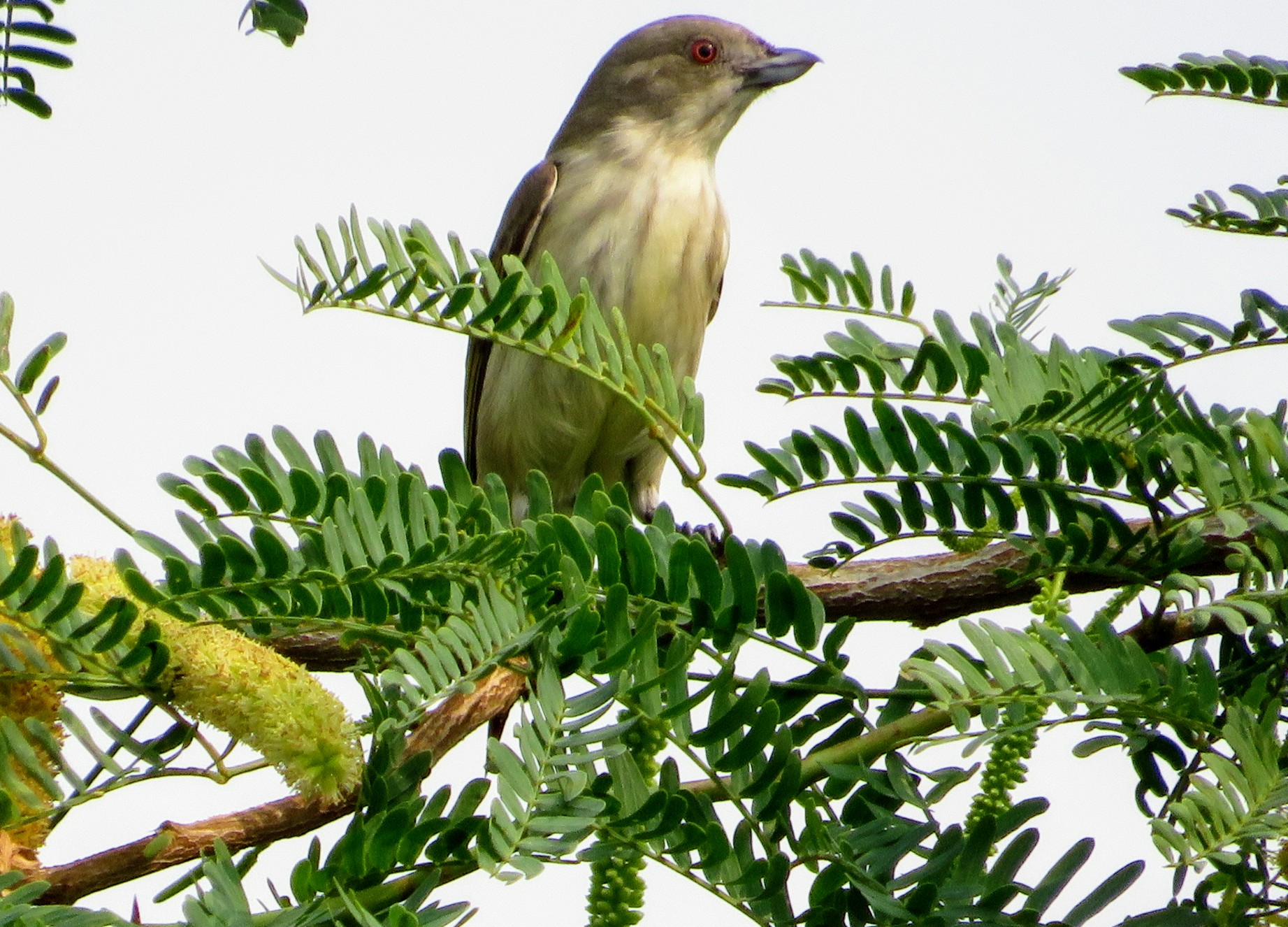
Dicaeum agile agile from Gujarat
