= Loranth =

Loranth, in biology, can refer to a plant of the genus

- Loranthus, or of the family which subsumes it, the
- Loranthaceae.

Also,

- Loranth (Lóránth) is a Hungarian surname.
