= Gatesclarkeana erotias =

Scientific classification
- Kingdom: Animalia
- Phylum: Arthropoda
- Class: Insecta
- Order: Lepidoptera
- Family: Tortricidae
- Genus: Gatesclarkeana
- Species: G. erotias

Binomial name
- Gatesclarkeana erotias (Meyrick, 1905)

Synonyms
- Platypeplus erotias Meyrick, 1905; Argyroploce erotias Meyrick, 1911; Olethreutes erotias Clarke, 1958; Gatesclarkeana erotias Diakonoff, 1966

Species of moth

Gatesclarkeana erotias is a moth of the family Tortricidae first described by Edward Meyrick in 1905. It is found in India, Sri Lanka, Timor and Thailand.

Larval food plants are Averrhoa carambola, Bauhinia purpurea, Bauhinia tomentosa, Lantana camara, Loranthus, Mallotus repandus, Mangifera indica and Sapindus mukorossi.
