= Ukamenia =

Scientific classification
- Domain: Eukaryota
- Kingdom: Animalia
- Phylum: Arthropoda
- Class: Insecta
- Order: Lepidoptera
- Family: Tortricidae
- Tribe: Gatesclarkeanini
- Genus: Ukamenia; Oku, 1980

Synonyms
- Aphiaris Kuznetzov, 1981

Genus of tortrix moths

Ukamenia is a genus of moths belonging to the subfamily Olethreutinae of the family Tortricidae.

== Species ==
- Ukamenia sapporensis (Matsumura, 1931)

== See also ==
- List of Tortricidae genera
