= Gatesclarkeanini =

Scientific classification
- Kingdom: Animalia
- Phylum: Arthropoda
- Class: Insecta
- Order: Lepidoptera
- Family: Tortricidae
- Subfamily: Olethreutinae
- Tribe: Gatesclarkeanini; Diakonoff, 1973

Genera
- See text

Tribe of moths

The Gatesclarkeanini are a tribe of tortrix moths.

== Genera ==
- Asymmetrarcha
- Atsusina
- Gatesclarkeana
- Hiroshiinoueana
- Ukamenia
