= Ukamenia sapporensis =

Scientific classification
- Kingdom: Animalia
- Phylum: Arthropoda
- Clade: Pancrustacea
- Class: Insecta
- Order: Lepidoptera
- Family: Tortricidae
- Genus: Ukamenia
- Species: U. sapporensis

Binomial name
- Ukamenia sapporensis (Matsumura, 1931)

Synonyms
- Simaethis sapporensis Matsumura, 1931; Choreutis sapporensis; Aphiaris mirana Kuznetzov, 1981

Species of moth

Ukamenia sapporensis is a moth in the family Tortricidae. It was described by Shōnen Matsumura in 1931. It is found in Japan (Hokkaido, Honshu) and the Russian Far East.

The wingspan is 10.5-14.5 mm.

Larvae have been recorded feeding on Hamamelis japonica, Vaccinium oldhami, Quercus mongolica and Castanea crenata.
