= Dendrophthoe memecylifolia =

Scientific classification
- Kingdom: Plantae
- Clade: Tracheophytes
- Clade: Angiosperms
- Clade: Eudicots
- Order: Santalales
- Family: Loranthaceae
- Genus: Dendrophthoe
- Species: D. memecylifolia

Binomial name
- Dendrophthoe memecylifolia (Wight & Arn.) Danser

Species of mistletoe

Dendrophthoe memecylifolia is one of the hemiparasitic plants that belong to the mistletoe family Loranthaceae. This species is endemic to South India, occurring in the subtropical and temperate forests of the Western Ghats. It is commonly found in shola forests above 1200 m altitude, growing on a variety of host plants. Its range includes Karnataka, Kerala, and Tamil Nadu. The plant has slender, smooth branches with small pores. Its leaves grow in pairs, are oval to elliptic in shape, leathery in texture, and about 4–6 cm long. Flowers appear in small clusters, with club-shaped buds and five joined petals. The fruits are small, smooth, and oval, about 1 cm long, with a tiny rim at the base that remains attached.
