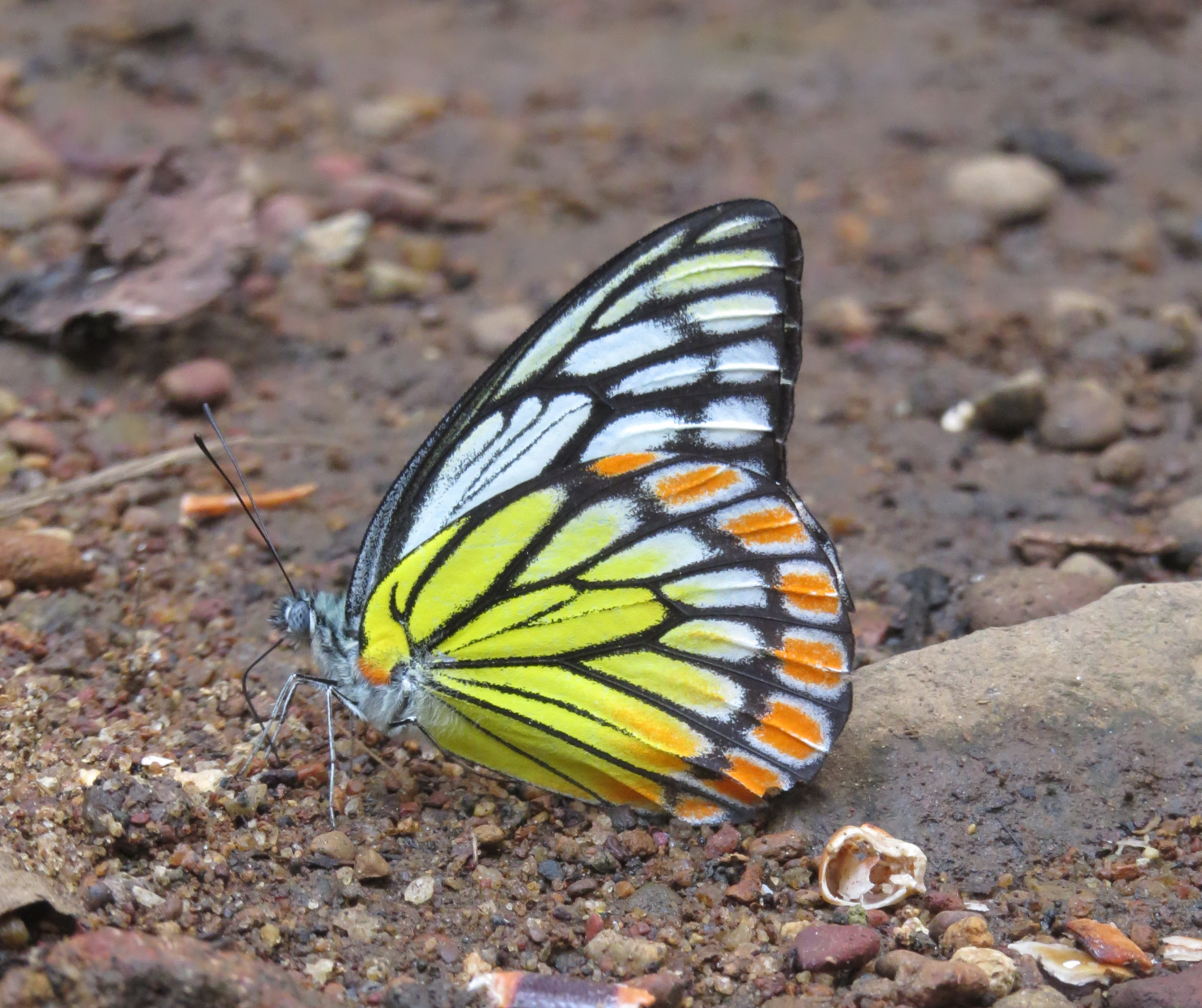
- Mud-puddling

Scientific classification
- Kingdom: Animalia
- Phylum: Arthropoda
- Class: Insecta
- Order: Lepidoptera
- Family: Pieridae
- Genus: Prioneris
- Species: P. sita

Binomial name
- Prioneris sita C. Felder, 1865

= Prioneris sita =

Painted sawtooth

Species of butterfly

Prioneris sita, the painted sawtooth, is a small butterfly of the family Pieridae, that is, the yellows and whites, which is found in south India and Sri Lanka.

== Description ==
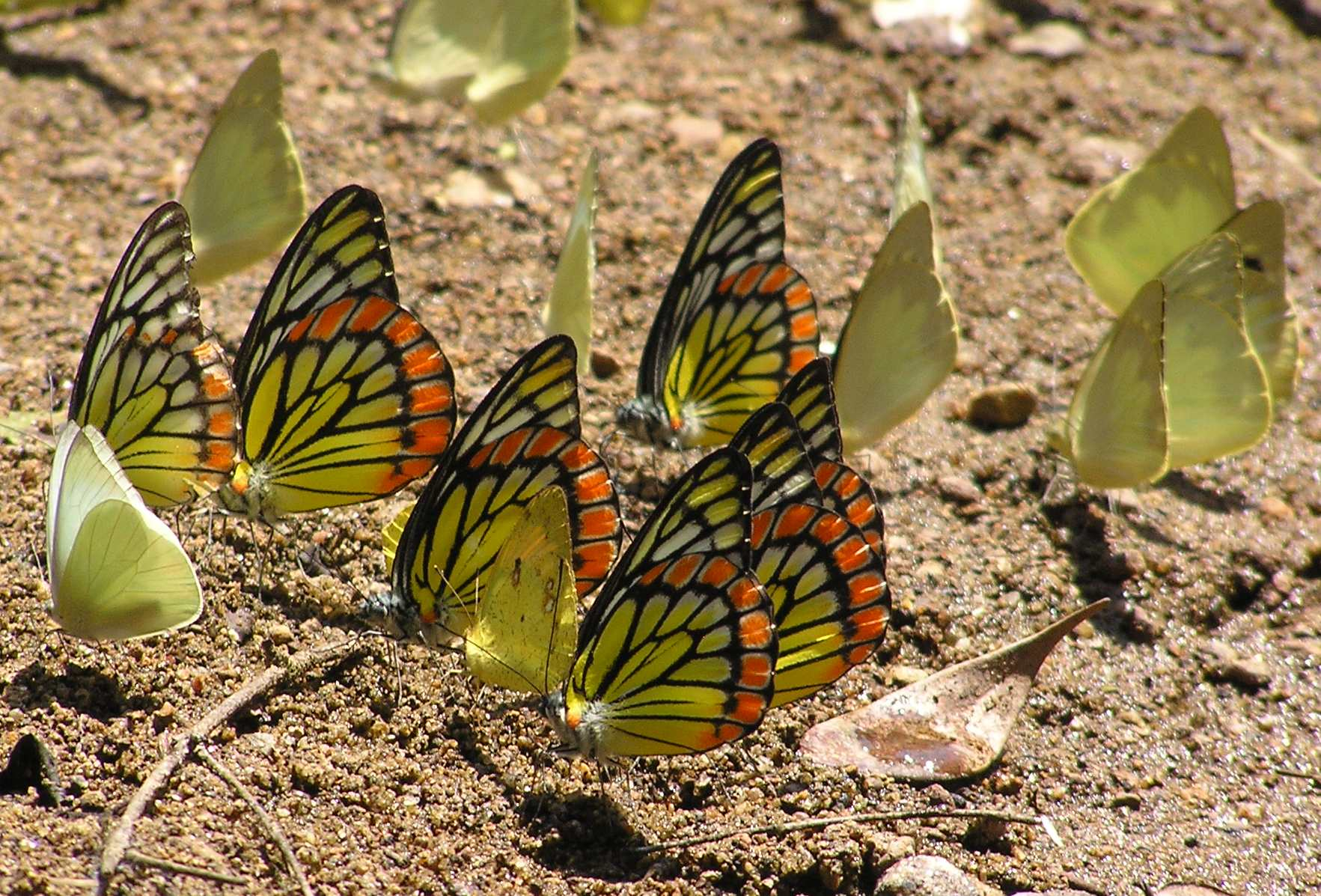
Painted sawtooth mud-puddling. The species it mimics, the common Jezebel, is never found mud-puddling

Upperside: White with a slight greenish tint. Forewings and hindwings: The markings of the underside faintly visible through the wing.

Underside: Forewing: White, costa black and the apex suffuse with yellow. Hindwing: Rich chrome yellow up to a postdiscal band. Beyond this the ground color is white with a series of large terminal vermillion-red spots. These spots are rectangular or truncated cone shaped.

The antennae is brownish black. Head and thorax are covered with long bluish-grey hairs. The abdomen is greyish white.

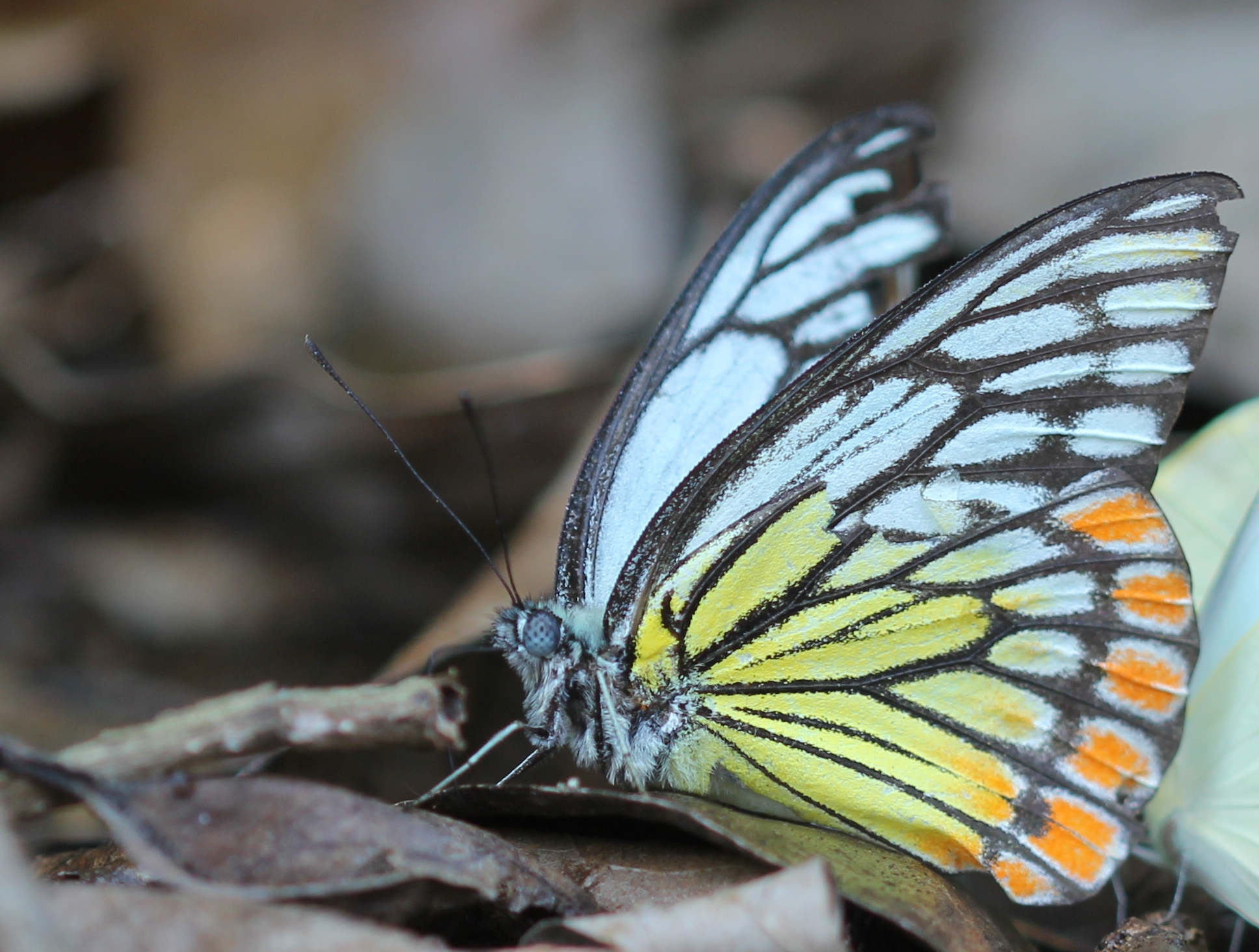
Mud-puddling in Someshwara

Wingspan: 86–90 mm (3.40-3.55 in).

== Mimicry ==
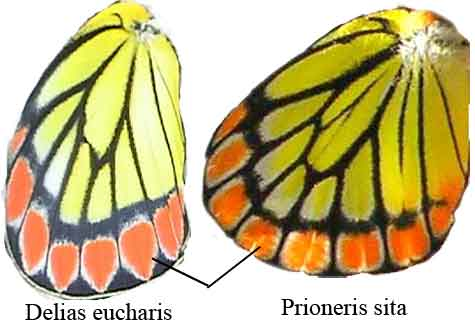
Underside hindwing difference between Delias eucharis and Prioneris sita

The painted sawtooth is a Batesian mimic of Delias eucharis, the common Jezebel, which has a much greater range, covering the entire Indian peninsula. Prioneris sita is only found in a small stretch of the Western Ghats, ranging from West-Central Karnataka, to the Nilgiris and Wayanad, south to Nilambur. It is a rare visitor to Travancore. The two can be told apart from the shape of the hindwing. The painted sawtooth has a much broader hindwing. The orange-red spots on the margin of the hindwing, in the painted sawtooth, are more squarish in shape whereas in the common Jezebel they are arrowhead shaped. The painted sawtooth also flies faster and inhabits dense forests. Unlike the common Jezebel it can also be found mud-puddling.

== Life cycle ==
Larva: Dull blue green. The head and all the segments are dotted with minute blue tubercles, those on the head and sides are black tipped. Dorsal surface pubescent with a lateral fringe of soft white hairs below the spiracles.

Pupa: Bright green in color. Sharply pointed at the head, with two strong lateral points and keeled on the dorsal surface of the thoracic segments. There is an interrupted yellow dorsal line, and a short curved crimson line on each side below the thoracic segments bordering a small white irregular black speckled spot.

== See also ==
- List of butterflies of India
- List of butterflies of India (Pieridae)
