= Gatesclarkeana tenebrosa =

Scientific classification
- Kingdom: Animalia
- Phylum: Arthropoda
- Class: Insecta
- Order: Lepidoptera
- Family: Tortricidae
- Genus: Gatesclarkeana
- Species: G. tenebrosa

Binomial name
- Gatesclarkeana tenebrosa (Turner, 1916)

Synonyms
- Argyroploce tenebrosa Turner, 1916

Species of moth

Gatesclarkeana tenebrosa is a species of moth of the family Tortricidae. It is found in Australia, where it has been recorded from Queensland.

The wingspan is about 16 mm. The forewings are pale brown with patchy fuscous suffusion and dark-fuscous broken transverse lines. The hindwings are fuscous.
