= Gatesclarkeana =

Scientific classification
- Kingdom: Animalia
- Phylum: Arthropoda
- Clade: Pancrustacea
- Class: Insecta
- Order: Lepidoptera
- Family: Tortricidae
- Tribe: Gatesclarkeanini
- Genus: Gatesclarkeana; Diakonoff, 1966

Genus of tortrix moths

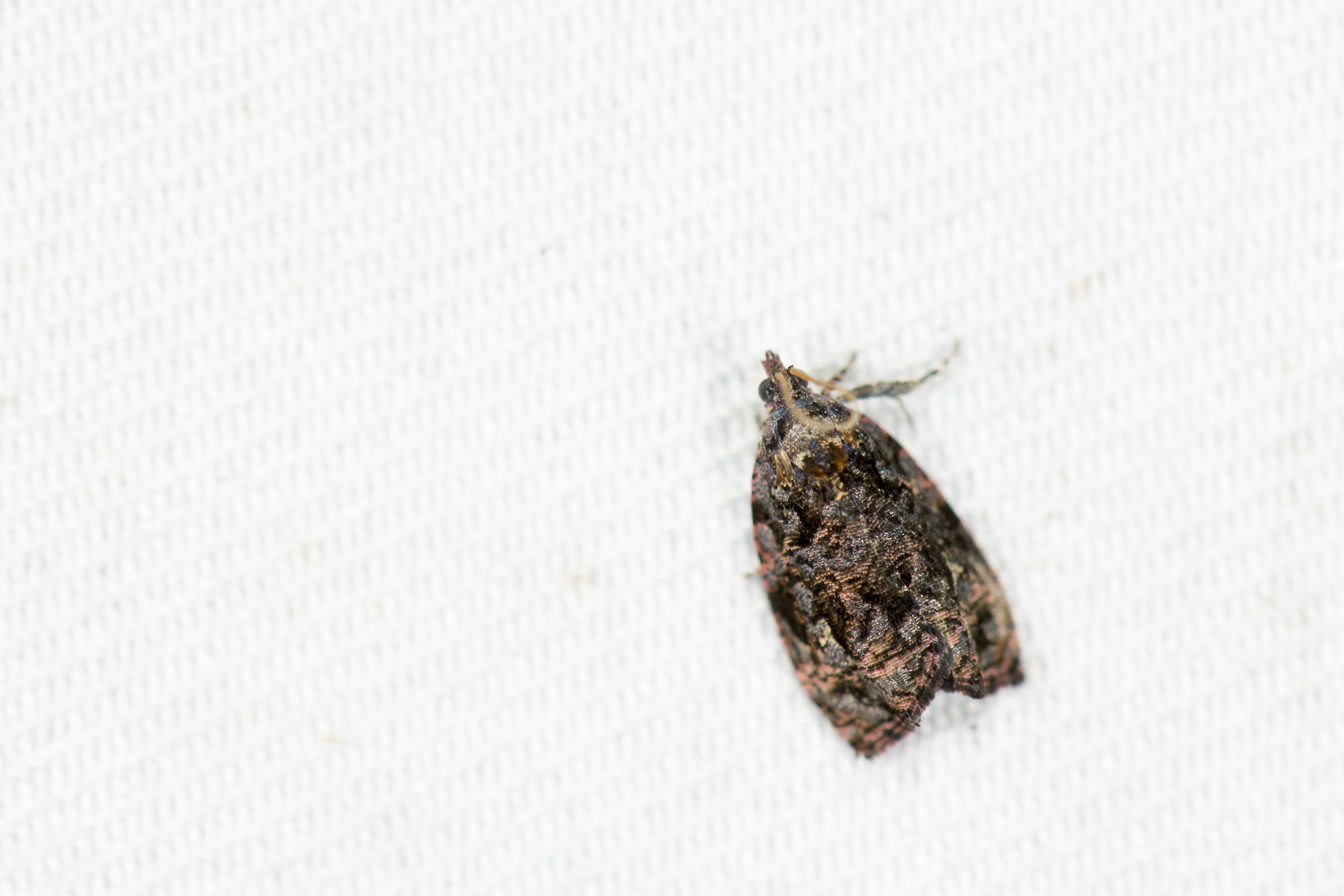

Gatesclarkeana is a genus of moths belonging to the subfamily Olethreutinae of the family Tortricidae.

== Species ==
- Gatesclarkeana batianensis Diakonoff, 1973
- Gatesclarkeana confracta Diakonoff, 1973
- Gatesclarkeana domestica Diakonoff, 1973
- Gatesclarkeana eothina Diakonoff, 1973
- Gatesclarkeana erotias (Meyrick, 1905)
- Gatesclarkeana idia Diakonoff, 1973
- Gatesclarkeana moderatrix Diakonoff, 1973
- Gatesclarkeana pachnodes (Meyrick, 1911)
- Gatesclarkeana senior Diakonoff, 1966
- Gatesclarkeana tenebrosa (Turner, 1916)

== See also ==
- List of Tortricidae genera
