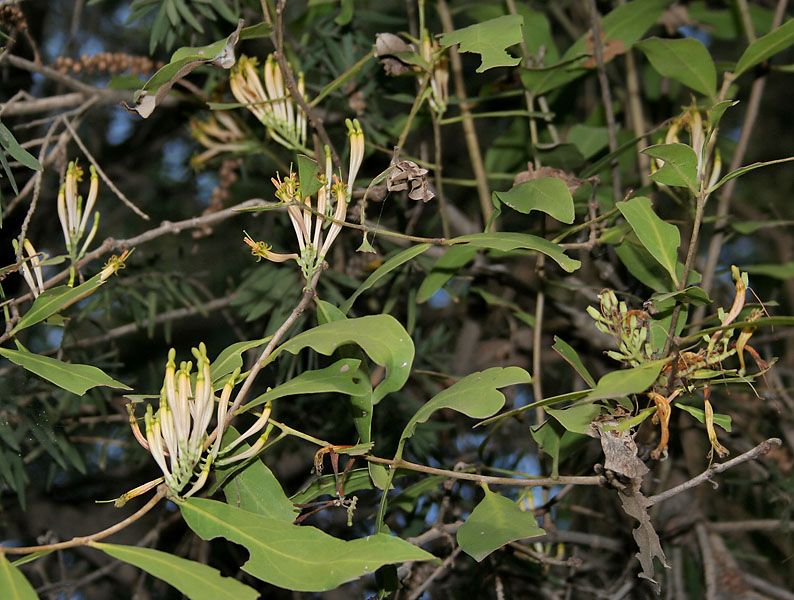
- Dendrophthoe falcata in Hyderabad, India

Scientific classification
- Kingdom: Plantae
- Clade: Tracheophytes
- Clade: Angiosperms
- Clade: Eudicots
- Order: Santalales
- Family: Loranthaceae
- Genus: Dendrophthoe
- Species: D. falcata

Binomial name
- Dendrophthoe falcata (L.f.) Ettingsh

= Dendrophthoe falcata =

Species of mistletoe

Dendrophthoe falcata is one of the hemiparasitic plants that belong to the mistletoe family Loranthaceae. It is the most common of all the mistletoes that occur in India. At the moment reports say that it has around 401 plant hosts. The genus Dendrophthoe comprises about 31 species spread across tropical Africa, Asia, and Australia (Flora of China, 2003) among which 7 species are found in India.

D.falcata bears grey bark, thick coriaceous leaves variable in shape with stout flowers (Wealth of India. 2002). The inflorescence of D.falcata was described formerly as axillary or as developing from the scars of fallen leaves, but Y.P.S Pundir (1996) determined it to be of strictly cauliflorous nature and noted also that it bears a certain similarity to those of the fig species Ficus glomerata, F. pomifera and F. hispida. Two of its varieties are widespread in India namely, var. falcata (honeysuckle mistletoe) and var. coccinea (red honeysuckle mistletoe) distinguishable by their bearing white and red flowers respectively. (Flowers of India). To date, D.falcata bears the distinction of being the mistletoe species with the largest global host range (Calvin and Wilson, 2009) - a range which is continuously and rapidly widening to include more and more host species.

== Host-parasite interface ==
Among angiosperms, parasitic relationship through the formation of haustorial linkages is known to be widespread (Wilson and Calvin, 2006). In general, haustorial connections among 72 (of the 75) aerial parasitic genera may belong to either of the four types viz., epicortical roots (ERs), clasping unions, wood roses, and bark strands (Calvin and Wilson, 1998). ERs may run along the host branches in either direction forming haustorial structures at variable intervals while “unions” occur as single points of attachment of individual parasites hence pronounced as solitary. In D.falcata on different hosts two of the haustorial kinds have been observed viz., solitary unions as on Sugar apple (Annona squamosa), and epicortical roots as on Sapota (Achras zapota), guava (Psidium guajava), pomegranate (Punica granatum) have been known. It is unknown about what factors decide formation of different haustorial types by the leafy mistletoe on different hosts. The host branches infected with D.falcata show a gradual reduction in growth and diameter as compared to other healthy uninfected branches (Karunaichamy et al., 1999). This mistletoe does not have an indigenous rooting system and is dependent on the host for water and minerals. Nutrient dynamics have shown that a higher titre of N, P, K, Mg and Na in the leaves of mistletoe than the leaves of uninfected and infected hosts which may be due to differential translocation of elements within the host phloem (Surya Prakash et al., 1967; Karunaichamy et al., 1999). The haustorial connections of the parasite with the plant are devoid of any efficient retranslocation system (Smith and Stewart, 1990).

== Seed dispersal and pollination ==
Seed dispersal and pollination are usually mediated by the birds that thrive on fruits from the parasite and/or host. Particularly in southern India, Tickel’s flowerpecker (also called the pale-billed flowerpecker) is reported to facilitate seed dispersal of D. falcata among Neem through fecal excretions or regurgitations (Karunaichamy et al., 1999; Hambali, 1977 and references therein). Studies conducted at the higher altitudes of the Western Ghats (where both the mistletoes and the flowerpeckers occur predominantly), which parallel the western coast of India infer that the flowerpecker pollinated mistletoes have particularly developed features specialized to attract a unique vector both to facilitate pollination and seed dispersal: the fruit and flowers have similar resemblance and more significantly, the fruiting time overlap with the next flowering season (Davidar, 1983). The hair-crested drongo (sometimes called the spangled drongo) and sunbirds are also known to feed on the nectar from the D.falcata flowers adding to the list of pollinators to this mistletoe (Kunwar et al., 2005).

== Medicinal uses ==
Dendrophthoe falcata is used as traditional medicine through South and Central Asia. It possesses remarkable potential as a medicinal plant, as is evident from the wound healing, anti-microbial, anti-oxidant and antinociceptive properties of its ethanolic extracts (Pattanayak and Sunita, 2008, Shihab et al., 2006). Medicinal properties of this hemiparasite may vary in effects respective to different hosts it establishes a relation with (Mallavadhani et al., 2006).

The whole plant is used in indigenous system of medicine as cooling, bitter, astringent, aphrodisiac, narcotic and diuretic (Alekutty e al., 1993) and is useful in treating pulmonary tuberculosis, asthma, menstrual disorders, swelling wounds, ulcers, renal and vesical calculi and vitiated conditions of kapha and pitta (Anarthe et al., 2008; Sastry, 1952; Pattanayak et al., 2008 ). Also, the decoction of plant used by women as an anti-fertility agent has been evidenced to possess anticancer activity (Nadkarni, 1993). The leaf ethanolic extract significantly and dose dependently inhibits the acetic acid induced writhing in mice (Shihab et al., 2006) and has indicated a low level toxicity in the brine shrimp lethality assays. Besides, a more recent work by Pattanayak et al. (2008) shows significant tumor reduction in induced mammary carcinogenesis in Wistar female rats when fed with hydroalcoholic extracts of D. falcata.

== Diseases ==
Dendrophthoe falcata is susceptible to diseases such as leaf blight caused by Colletotrichum stage of Glomerella cingulata (Mohamed Ali and Florence, 1987).

== Hyper-parasitism ==
Dendrophthoe falcata can be parasitised by Scurrula cordifolia (another mistletoe) (Pundir, 1979). Similarly, Viscum orientale has also been reported to grow on D. falcata (Saxena, 1971). In another instance Cuscuta reflexa has been shown to act as a rival to the leafy mistletoe (Nath and Indira, 1975).

From a conservation biologists’ viewpoint mistletoes are considered as a keystone resource of biodiversity (Watson, 2001) and from that of an ethnobiologist’s and/or pharmacologist’s (Pattanayak et al., 2008), they possess numerous ethnomedicinal assets with prospects extending to promises even for use as an anti-tumor agent. Besides, a farmer’s perspective entails that they are notorious and devastating parasitic plants. Being backed by easy seed dispersal mediated by frugivorous birds, they continue to pose serious losses to economically valuable fruit trees, flowering plants and those with medicinal properties whether growing in forests, orchards or gardens (Sridhar and Rao, 1978).

== Gallery ==
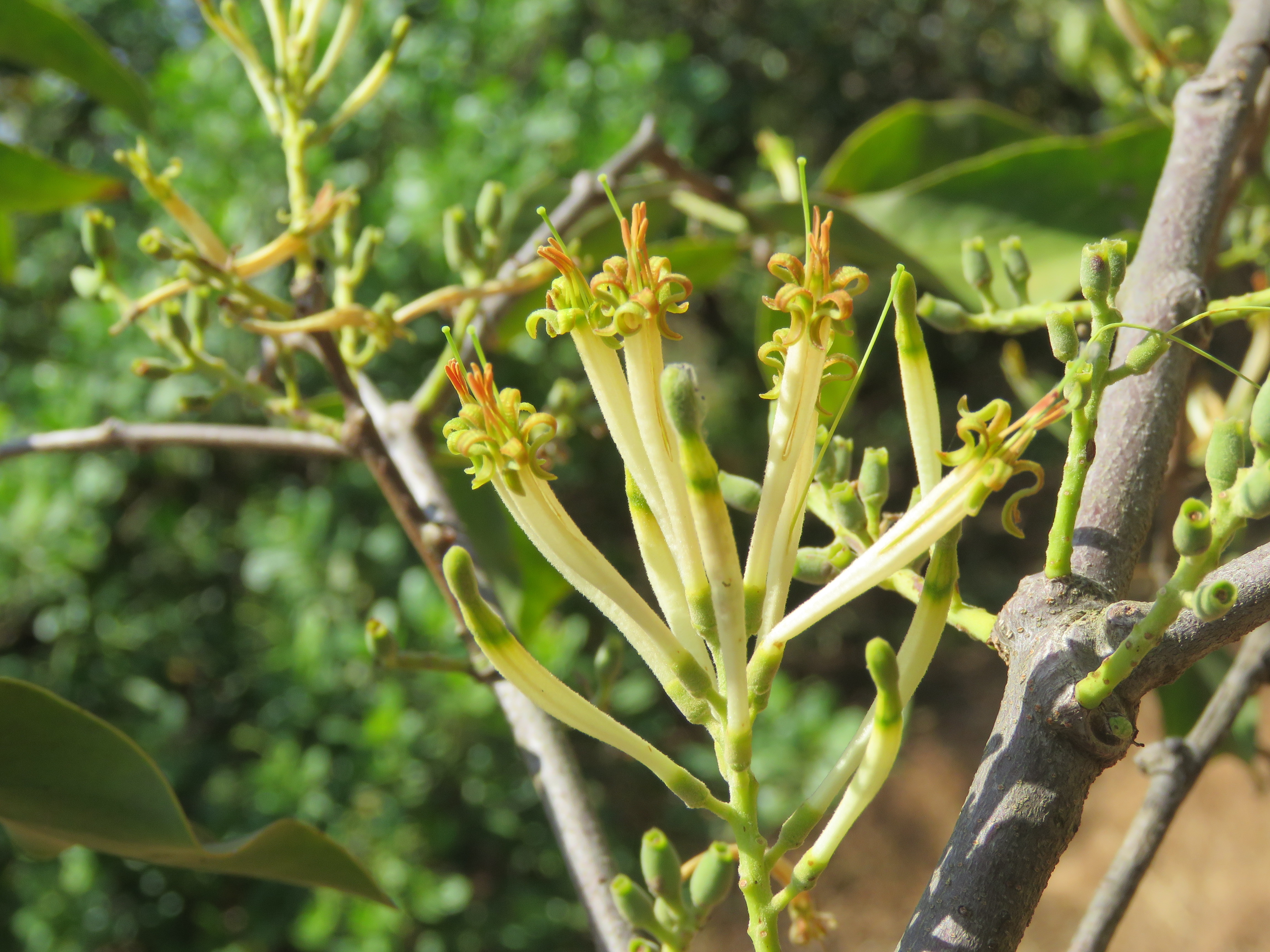
Dendrophthoe falcata (pale / 'white' variety) exhibiting its characteristic cauliflory.

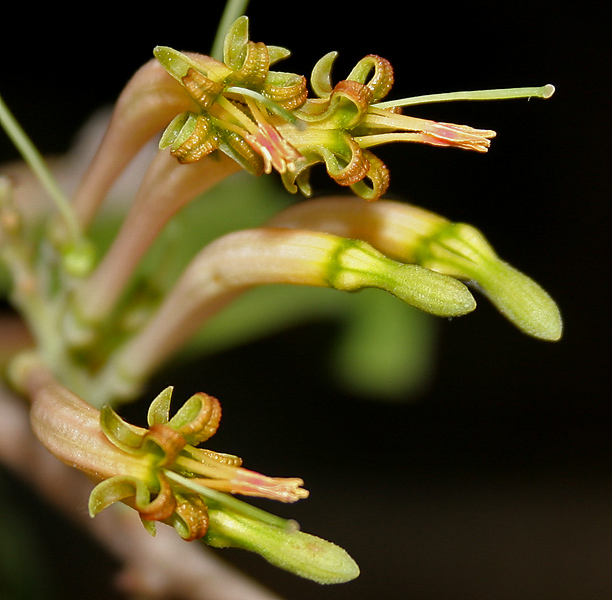
Close-up of flower mouths showing reflexed corolla lobes and exserted pistil and stamens.

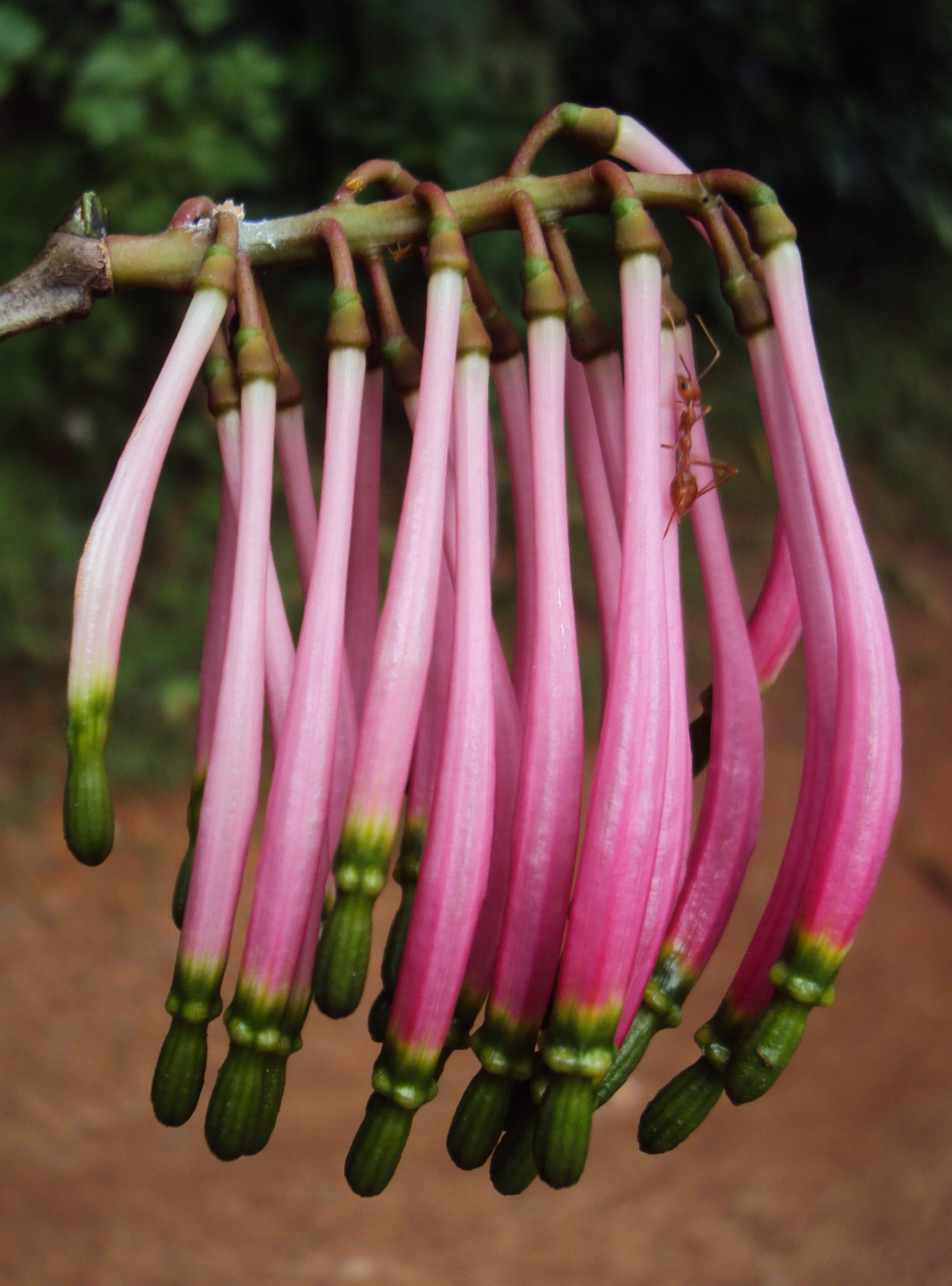
Elongate buds of red variety.

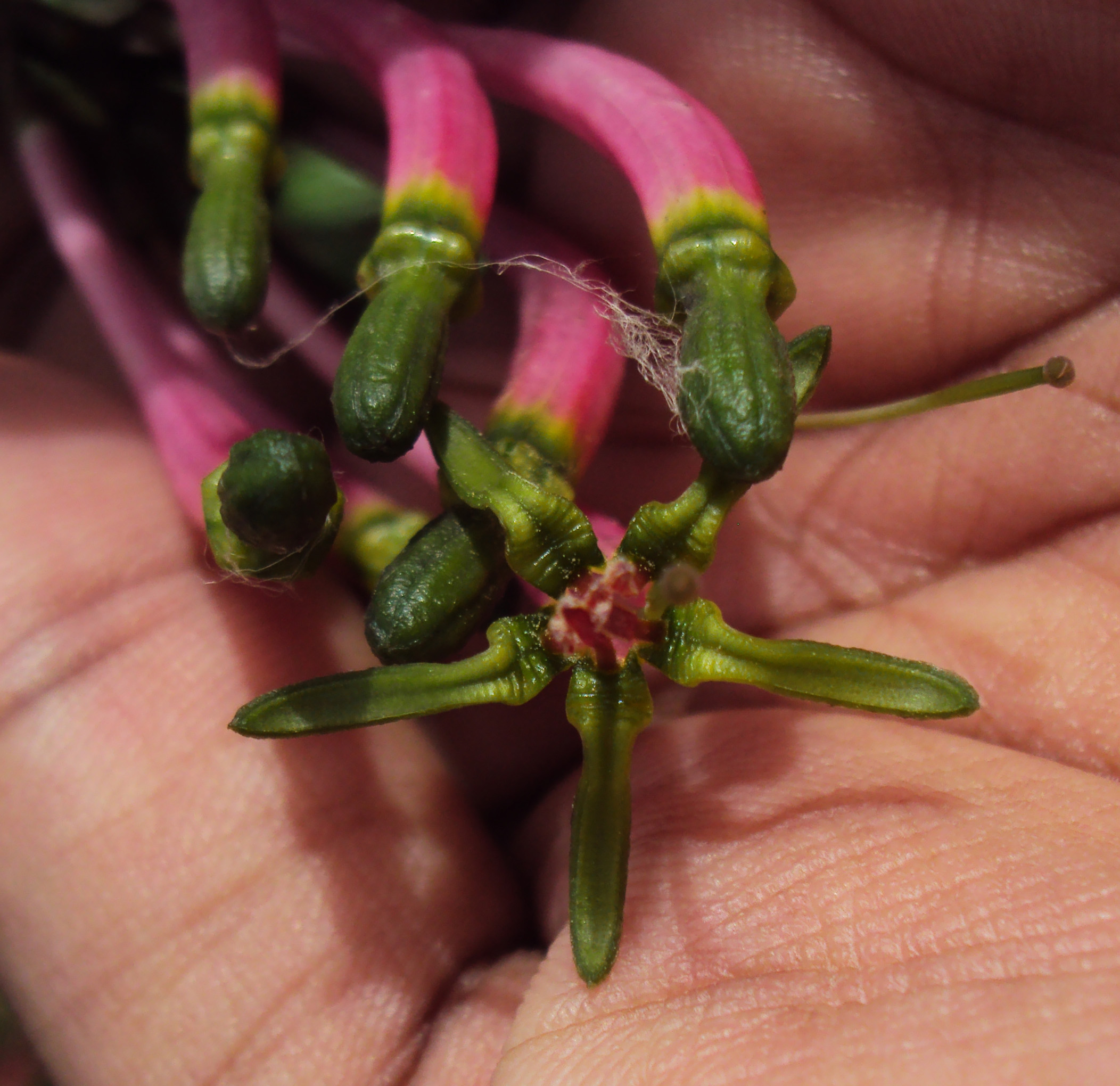
Buds and flower mouths of red variety, showing texture of green corolla limb and bud tips.

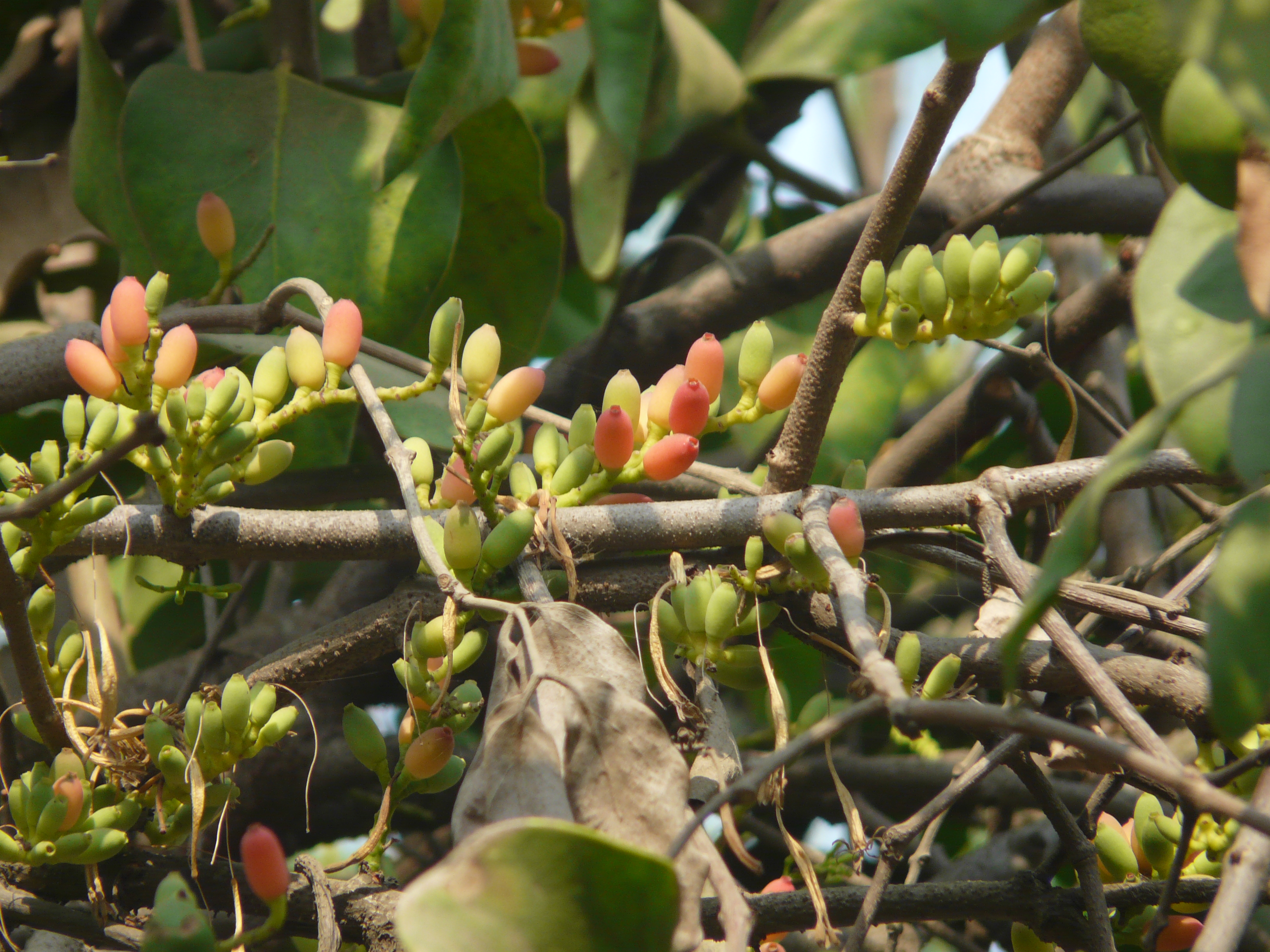
Fruits of Dendrophthoe falcata.
