= Dendrophthoe lanosa =

Scientific classification
- Kingdom: Plantae
- Clade: Tracheophytes
- Clade: Angiosperms
- Clade: Eudicots
- Order: Santalales
- Family: Loranthaceae
- Genus: Dendrophthoe
- Species: D. lanosa

Binomial name
- Dendrophthoe lanosa (Korth.) Danser

Synonyms
- Loranthus vulpinus Ridley; Loranthus thorelii Lecomte; Loranthus siamensis Kurz; Loranthus lanosus Korth. Loranthus casuarinae Ridl. Dendrophthoe vulpina Danser; Dendrophthoe thorelii Danser; Dendrophthoe siamensis Danser; Dendrophthoe siamensis (Kurz) Danser, Dendrophthoe magna Danser

Species of mistletoe

Dendrophthoe lanosa is a species of mistletoe in the family Loranthaceae; no subspecies are listed in the Catalogue of Life. Records are from Indo-China and Malesia; in Vietnam it may be called mộc ký Xiêm.
