= Atsusina =

Scientific classification
- Kingdom: Animalia
- Phylum: Arthropoda
- Class: Insecta
- Order: Lepidoptera
- Family: Tortricidae
- Tribe: Gatesclarkeanini
- Genus: Atsusina; Razowski, 2009
- Species: A. curiosissima

Binomial name
- Atsusina curiosissima Razowski, 2009

Genus of moths

Atsusina is a genus of moths belonging to the subfamily Olethreutinae of the family Tortricidae. It contains only one species, Atsusina curiosissima, which is found in Vietnam.

The wingspan is 12 mm.

== See also ==
- List of Tortricidae genera
