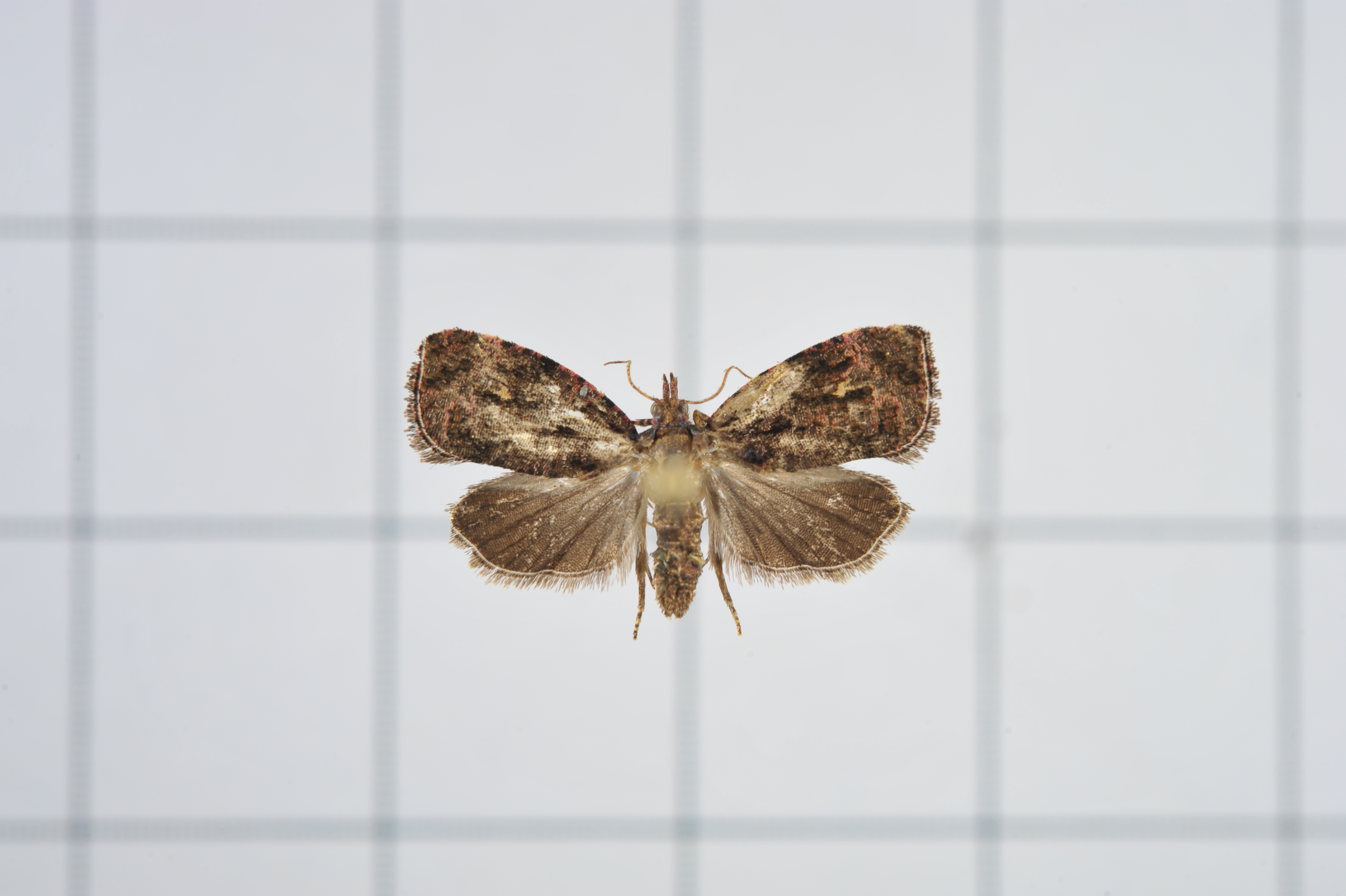

Scientific classification
- Domain: Eukaryota
- Kingdom: Animalia
- Phylum: Arthropoda
- Class: Insecta
- Order: Lepidoptera
- Family: Tortricidae
- Genus: Gatesclarkeana
- Species: G. idia

Binomial name
- Gatesclarkeana idia Diakonoff, 1973

Synonyms
- Gatesclarkeana idea Kawabe, 1975

= Gatesclarkeana idia =

Species of moth

Gatesclarkeana idia is a moth of the family Tortricidae. It is found in Japan, Taiwan, China, Indonesia, Thailand and Vietnam.

The wingspan is 13–15 mm for males and 12.5–16 mm for females.

The larvae feed on Triadica sebifera and Melastoma malabathricum
