= Asymmetrarcha =

Scientific classification
- Kingdom: Animalia
- Phylum: Arthropoda
- Class: Insecta
- Order: Lepidoptera
- Family: Tortricidae
- Tribe: Gatesclarkeanini
- Genus: Asymmetrarcha; Diakonoff, 1973

Genus of tortrix moths

Asymmetrarcha is a genus of moths belonging to the subfamily Olethreutinae of the family Tortricidae.

== Species ==
- Asymmetrarcha iograpta (Meyrick, 1907)
- Asymmetrarcha metallicana Kuznetsov, 1992
- Asymmetrarcha thaiensis Kawabe, 1989
- Asymmetrarcha torquens Diakonoff, 1973
- Asymmetrarcha xenopa Diakonoff, 1973

== See also ==
- List of Tortricidae genera
