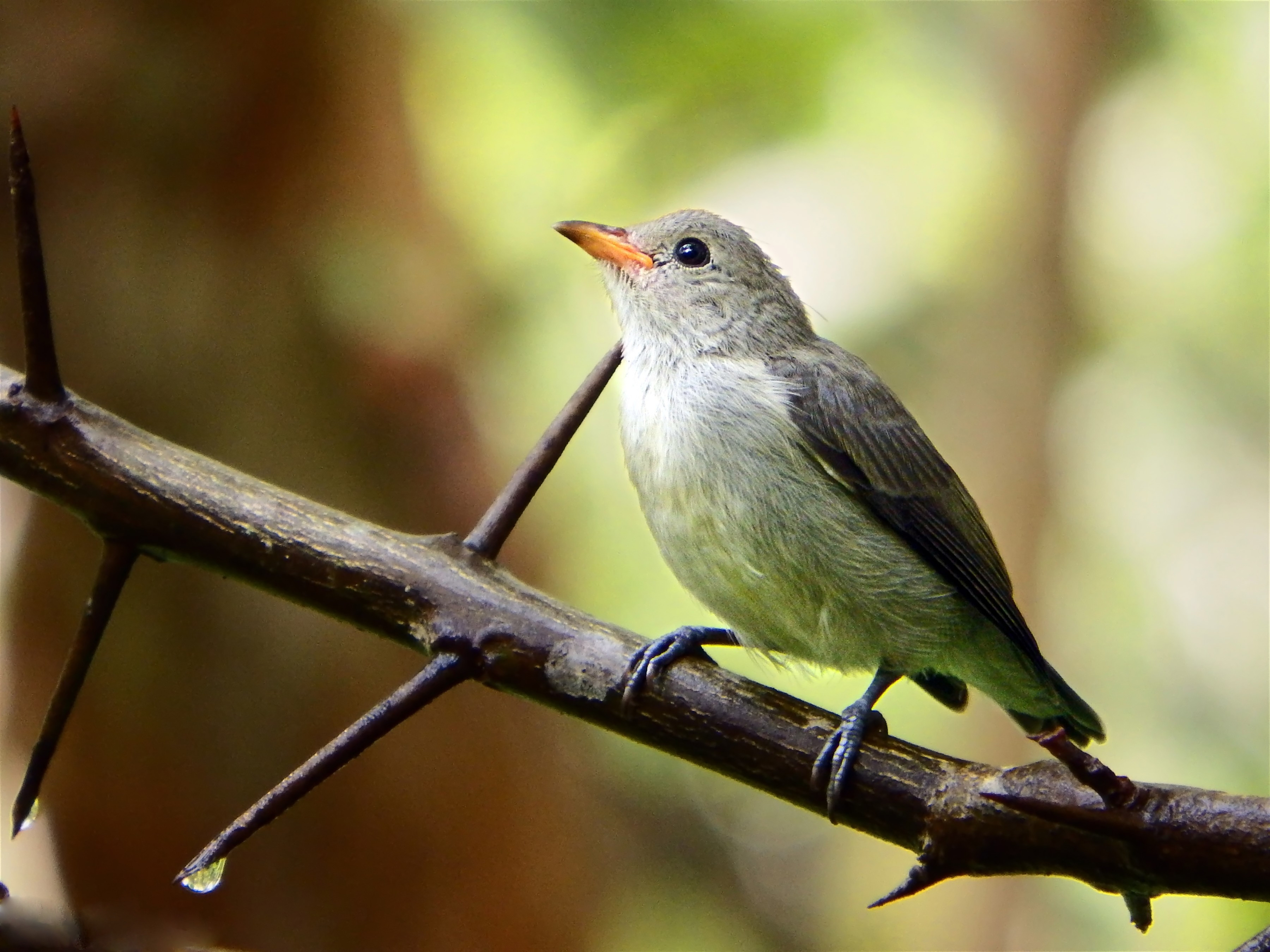

Conservation status
- Least Concern (IUCN 3.1)

Scientific classification
- Kingdom: Animalia
- Phylum: Chordata
- Class: Aves
- Order: Passeriformes
- Family: Dicaeidae
- Genus: Dicaeum
- Species: D. erythrorhynchos

Binomial name
- Dicaeum erythrorhynchos (Latham, 1790)

= Pale-billed flowerpecker =

Species of bird

The pale-billed flowerpecker or Tickell's flowerpecker (Dicaeum erythrorhynchos) is a tiny bird that feeds on nectar and berries, found in India, Sri Lanka, Bangladesh and western Myanmar. The bird is common especially in urban gardens with berry bearing trees. They have a rapid chipping call and the pinkish curved beak separates it from other species in the region.

== Description ==
This is a tiny bird, 8 cm long, and is one of the smallest birds occurring in most parts of southern India and Sri Lanka. The bird is plain brownish to olive green. The underside is buff olive and does not contrast greatly with the upperparts and not whitish as in the Nilgiri flowerpecker of the Western Ghats and Nilgiri hills nor is it streaked as in the thick-billed flowerpecker. The Nilgiri flowerpecker has a pale supercilium unlike this species which has no marking on the head. The Sri Lankan race ceylonense Babault, 1920 - is greyer and smaller than the nominate race of peninsular India. It has been considered one of the early flowerpeckers, originating in the Malay Peninsula, to colonize the Indian Subcontinent.

== Behaviour and ecology ==
In forested areas, they often visit the flowers of Loranthus (=Dendrophthoe) and Viscum species, the seeds of which are dispersed mainly by this and other flowerpecker species. The berries of these epiphytic parasites are usually swallowed whole (they sometimes pinch fruits and discard the seeds while feeding on the pulp but this technique is more often used by the syntopic thick-billed flowerpecker) and the seeds are voided after a rapid passage through their gut in about three to four minutes. The voided seed has a sticky coating and the bird applies its vent to the surface of a suitable perch and may turn around so as to get rid of the seed, which then sticks onto the branch where it may subsequently germinate. The flowers of Dendrophthoe falcata are pollinated by this species. The flower bud has a mechanism that causes pollen to explosively spray on the plumage of the visiting bird which nips the tips.

In urban areas, they are particularly attracted to introduced fruit trees such as Muntingia calabura, the fruits of which may be swallowed whole or, in the case of ripe berries, crushed and the pulp accessed using their tongue. They also sip nectar from flowers such as those of Sterculia colorata and Woodfordia floribunda, pollinating them in the process.

=== Breeding ===
Tickell's flowerpeckers breed from February to June. A second brood may be raised in September. The nest is a small pendant purse-like structure made of cobwebs, fibre, moss and down suspended from the tip of a twig high up in a tree. The opening is a slit and a clutch of two or three eggs is laid.

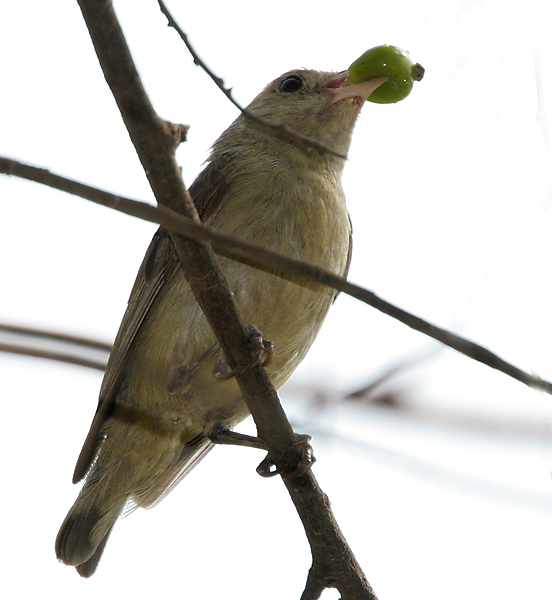
Feeding on a Muntingia calabura fruit

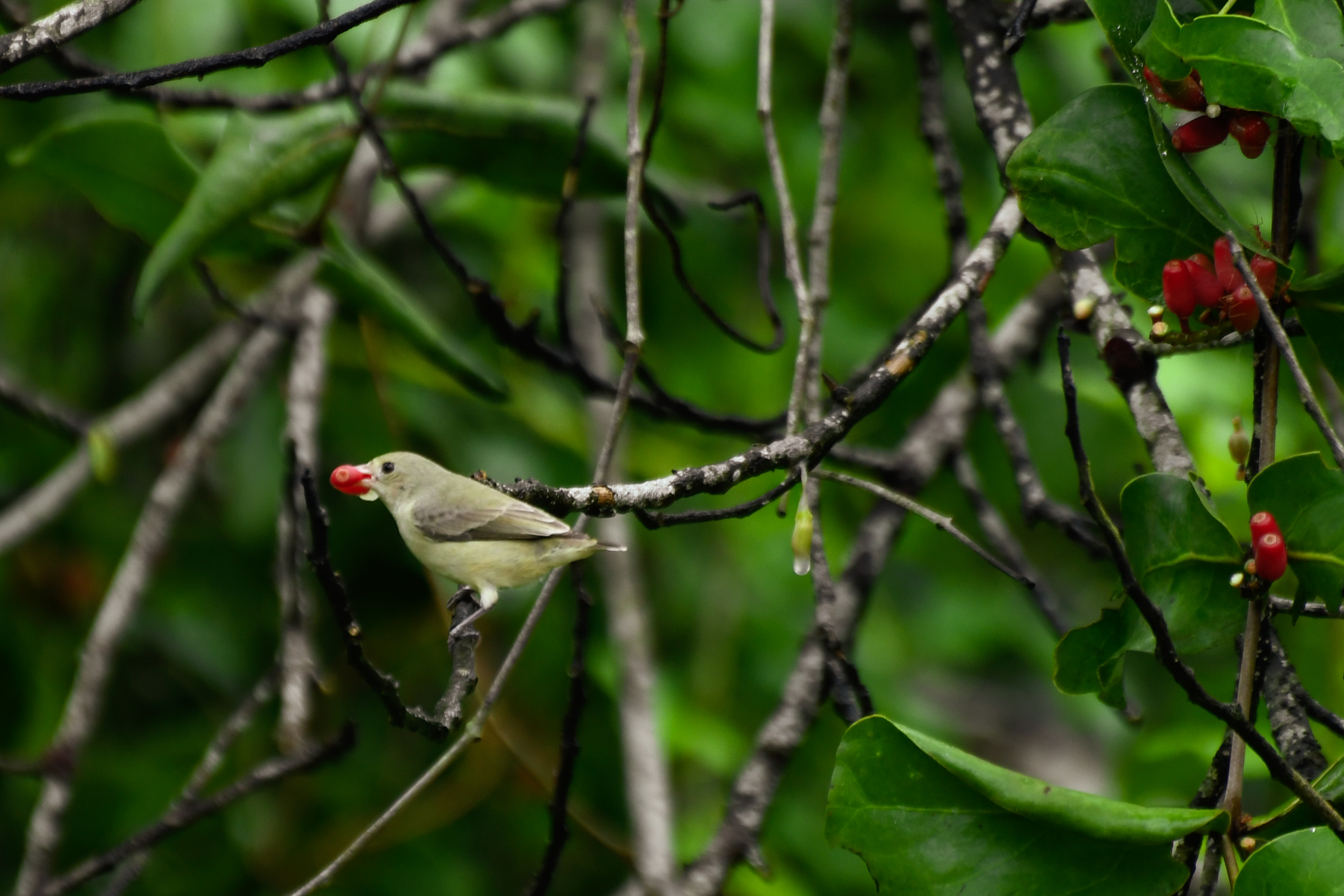
Pale-billed Flowerpecker on a Dendrophthoe falcata

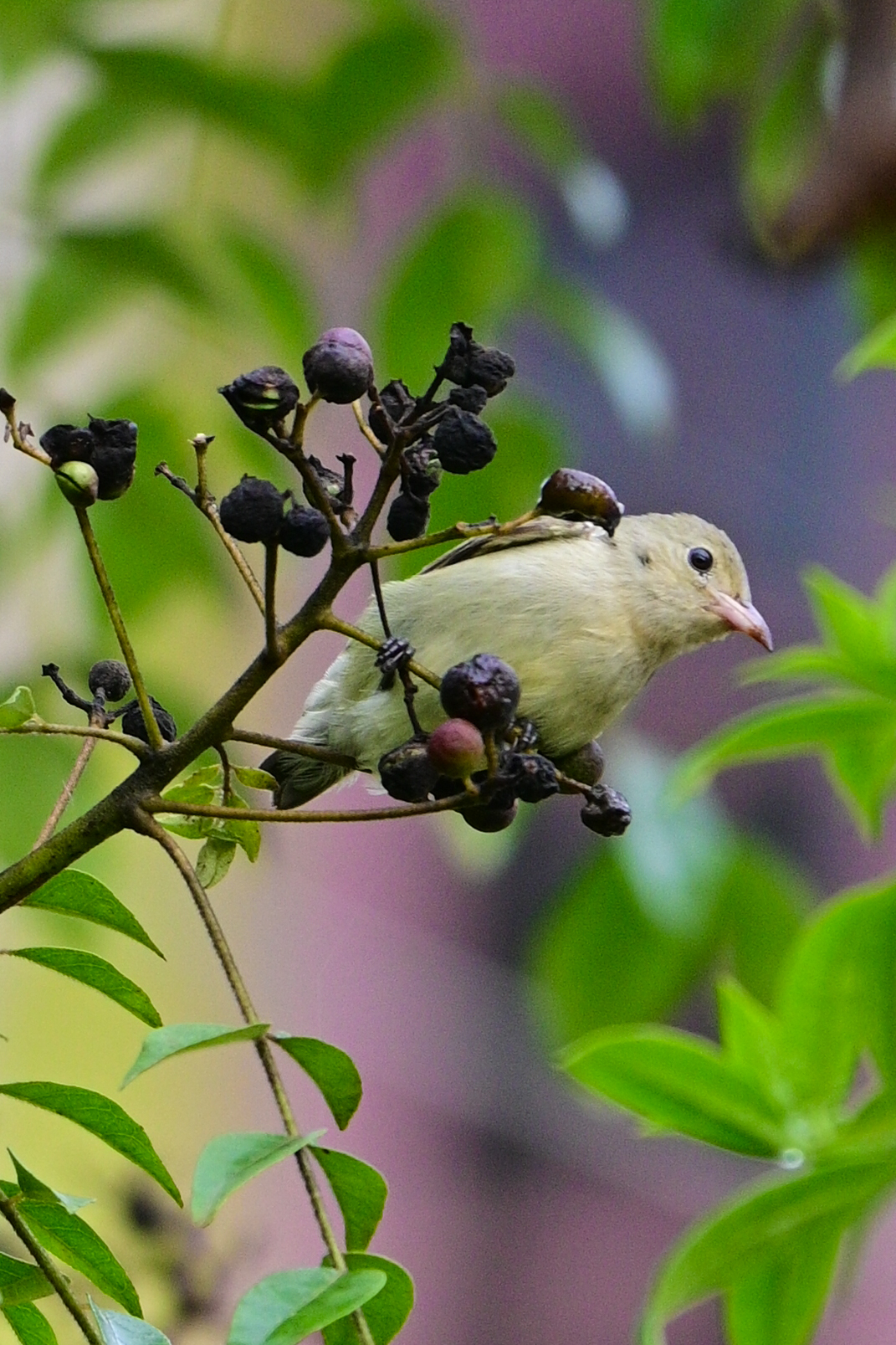
