= Gatesclarkeana senior =

Scientific classification
- Domain: Eukaryota
- Kingdom: Animalia
- Phylum: Arthropoda
- Class: Insecta
- Order: Lepidoptera
- Family: Tortricidae
- Genus: Gatesclarkeana
- Species: G. senior

Binomial name
- Gatesclarkeana senior Diakonoff, 1966

Synonyms
- Gatesclarkeana asynthetes Diakonoff, 1968

Species of moth

Gatesclarkeana senior is a moth of the family Tortricidae. It is found in Indonesia, the Philippines and Taiwan.

The wingspan is 16–18 mm for males and 15-18.5 mm for females.

The larvae have been reared from the leaves of Peltophorum pterocarpum and Lantana species.
