= Wood rose =

Wood rose or woodrose is a common name for several plants and may refer to:

- Dactylanthus taylorii, a parasitic plant endemic to New Zealand
- Hawaiian baby woodrose (Argyreia nervosa)
- Rosa gymnocarpa, a species of rose native to North America
- Species in the genus of Merremia
- Flower-shaped structures in tree wood following invasion and death of parasitic mistletoe plants
