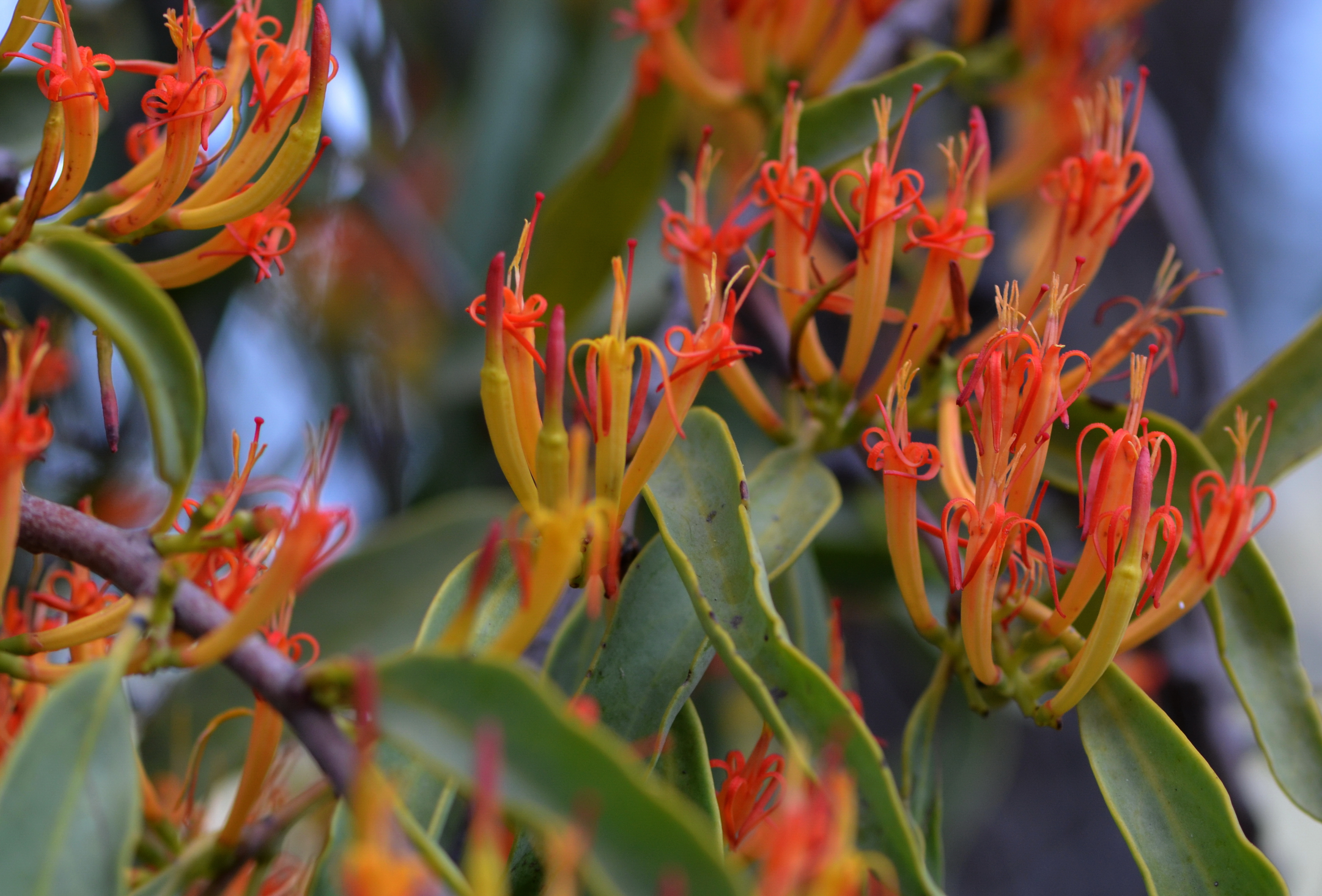

Conservation status
- Least Concern (NCA)

Scientific classification
- Kingdom: Plantae
- Clade: Embryophytes
- Clade: Tracheophytes
- Clade: Angiosperms
- Clade: Eudicots
- Order: Santalales
- Family: Loranthaceae
- Genus: Dendrophthoe
- Species: D. glabrescens

Binomial name
- Dendrophthoe glabrescens (Blakely) Barlow
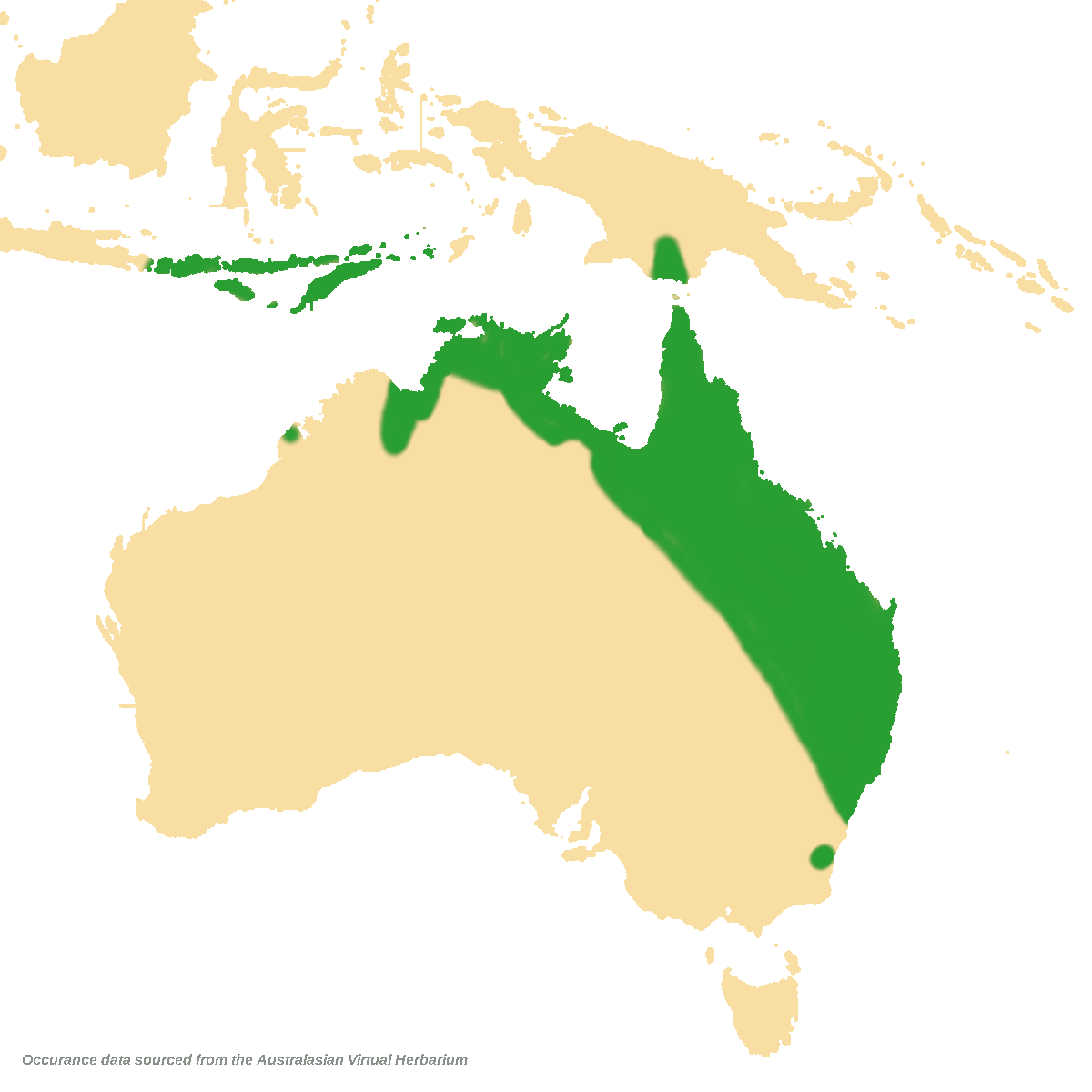

Synonyms
- Loranthus vitellinus var. glabrescens Blakely

= Dendrophthoe glabrescens =

Smooth mistltoe

Species of hemiparasitic plant

Dendrophthoe glabrescens, commonly known as smooth mistletoe or orange mistletoe, is a hemiparasitic plant of the mistletoe family Loranthaceae, found in eastern and northern Australia. It flowers from October to January. The flowers are tubular, with a green base, but where the tube splits open, it displays orange and bright red.

== Taxonomy ==
It was first described in 1925 as Loranthus vitellinus var. glabrescens by William Blakely, and in 1962 was transferred to the genus, Dendrophthoe, and raised to species status by Bryan Barlow.
