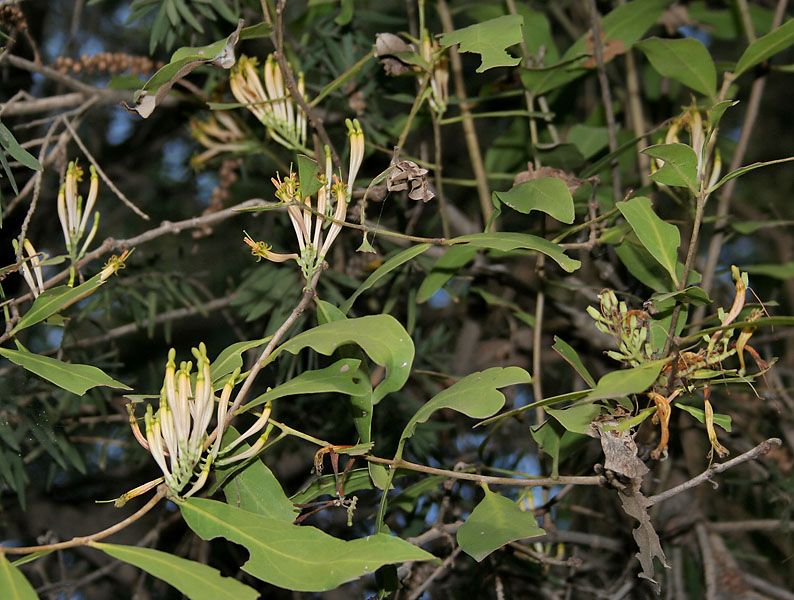
- Dendrophthoe falcata

Scientific classification
- Kingdom: Plantae
- Clade: Tracheophytes
- Clade: Angiosperms
- Clade: Eudicots
- Order: Santalales
- Family: Loranthaceae
- Genus: Dendrophthoe; Mart.

= Dendrophthoe =

Genus of mistletoes

Dendrophthoe is a genus of hemiparasitic shrubs found in Asia and Australia known as mistletoes. The genus was described by German naturalist Carl Friedrich Philipp von Martius in 1830. Species in this genus have a variety of reported uses in the medical traditions of the region, most notably in Nepal.

== Species ==
Plants of the World Online lists the following:

- Dendrophthoe acacioides (Benth.) Tiegh.
- Dendrophthoe carinata Danser
- Dendrophthoe clementis (Merr.) Danser
- Dendrophthoe constricta (Korth.) Danser
- Dendrophthoe copelandii (Merr.) Danser
- Dendrophthoe costulata Miq.
- Dendrophthoe curvata (Blume) Miq.
- Dendrophthoe falcata (L.f.) Ettingsh.
- Dendrophthoe flosculosa Danser
- Dendrophthoe fulva (Korth.) Miq.
- Dendrophthoe fuscata (Korth.) Miq.
- Dendrophthoe gangliiformis Barlow
- Dendrophthoe gjellerupii (Lauterb.) Danser
- Dendrophthoe glabrescens (Blakeley) Barlow
- Dendrophthoe haenkeana (C.Presl ex C.Schweinf.) Mart.
- Dendrophthoe hallieri (Merr.) Danser
- Dendrophthoe homoplastica (Blakeley) Danser
- Dendrophthoe incarnata (Jack) Miq.
- Dendrophthoe kerrii (Craib) Barlow
- Dendrophthoe lanosa (Korth.) Danser
- Dendrophthoe ligulatus (Thwaites) Tiegh.
- Dendrophthoe locellata Danser
- Dendrophthoe loheri (Merr.) Danser
- Dendrophthoe lonchiphylla (Thwaites) Danser
- Dendrophthoe longituba (Elmer) Danser
- Dendrophthoe luzonensis (C.Presl ex Schult.f.) G.Don
- Dendrophthoe malifolia (C.Presl ex Schult.f.) Miq.
- Dendrophthoe mearnsii (Merr.) Danser
- Dendrophthoe memecylifolia (Wight & Arn.) Danser
- Dendrophthoe mirifica Danser
- Dendrophthoe neelgherrensis (Wight & Arn.) Tiegh.
- Dendrophthoe odontocalyx (F.Muell. ex Benth.) Tiegh.
- Dendrophthoe pauciflora Danser
- Dendrophthoe pelagica Barlow
- Dendrophthoe pentandra (L.) Miq.
- Dendrophthoe pentapetala (Roxb.) G.Don
- Dendrophthoe praelonga (Blume) Miq.
- Dendrophthoe quadrifida Danser
- Dendrophthoe × rimituba Barlow
- Dendrophthoe sarcophylla (Wall. ex Wight & Arn.) Danser
- Dendrophthoe suborbicularis (Thwaites) Danser
- Dendrophthoe timorana (Danser) Barlow
- Dendrophthoe trichanthera Barlow
- Dendrophthoe villosa Danser
- Dendrophthoe vitellina (F.Muell.) Tiegh. (synonym Loranthus vitellinus)

== Gallery ==
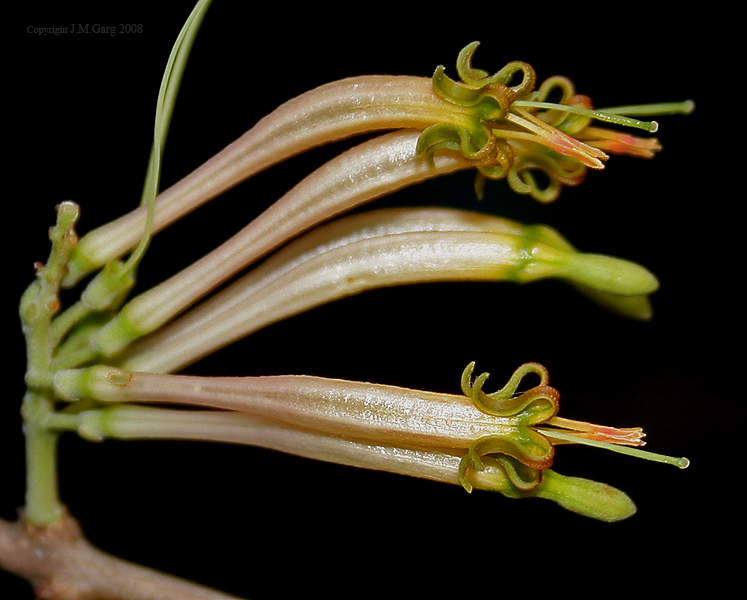
D. falcata

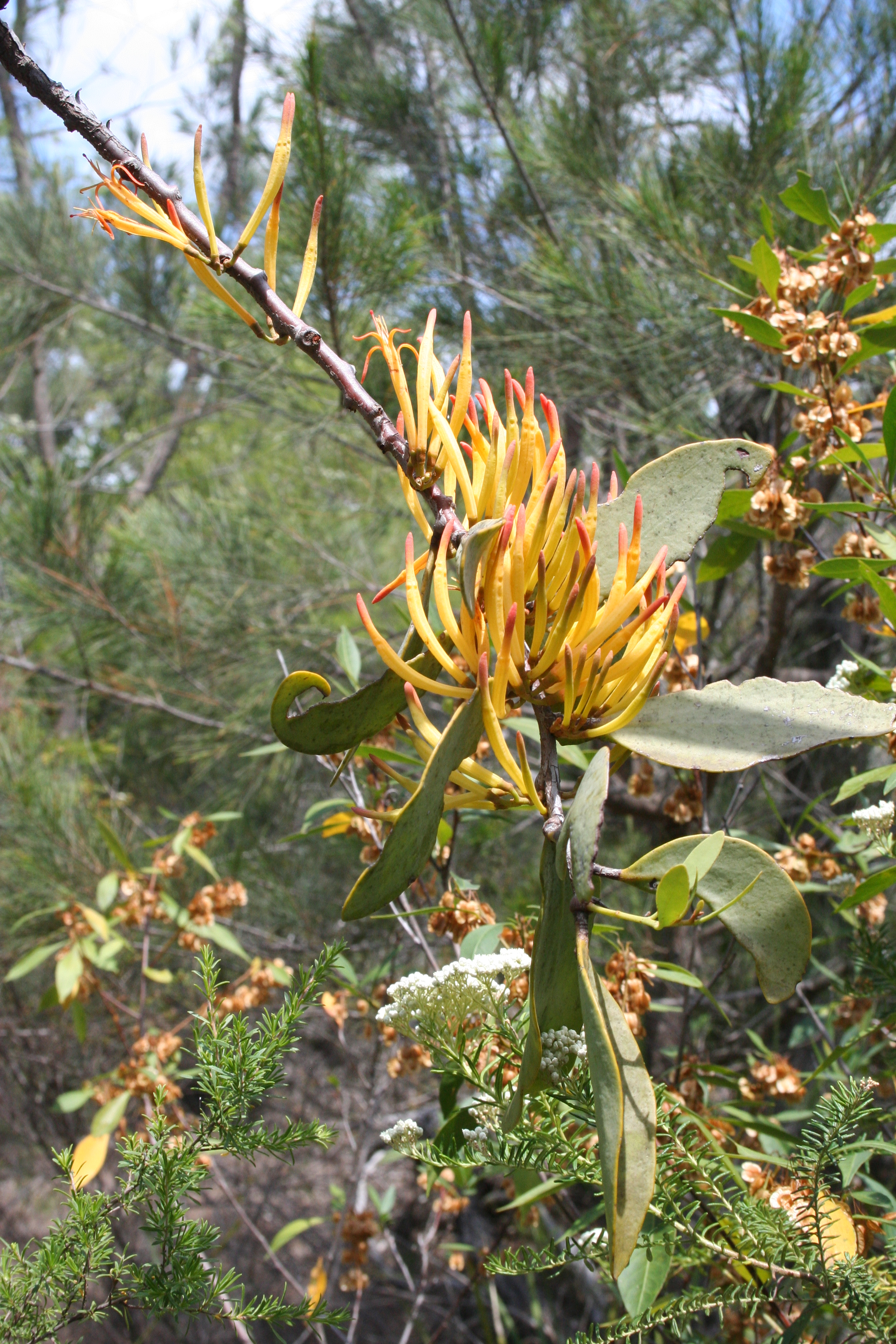
D. vitellina

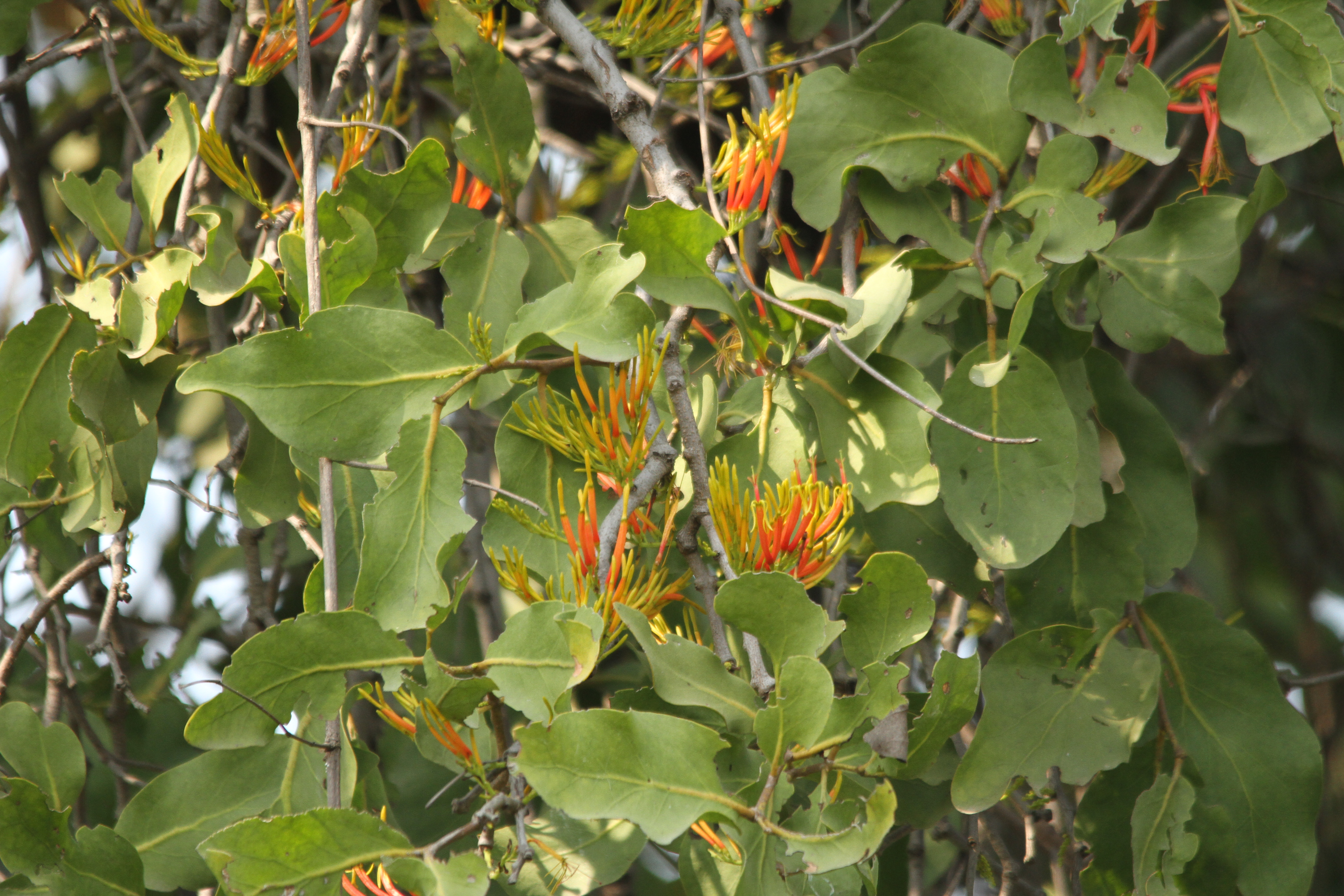

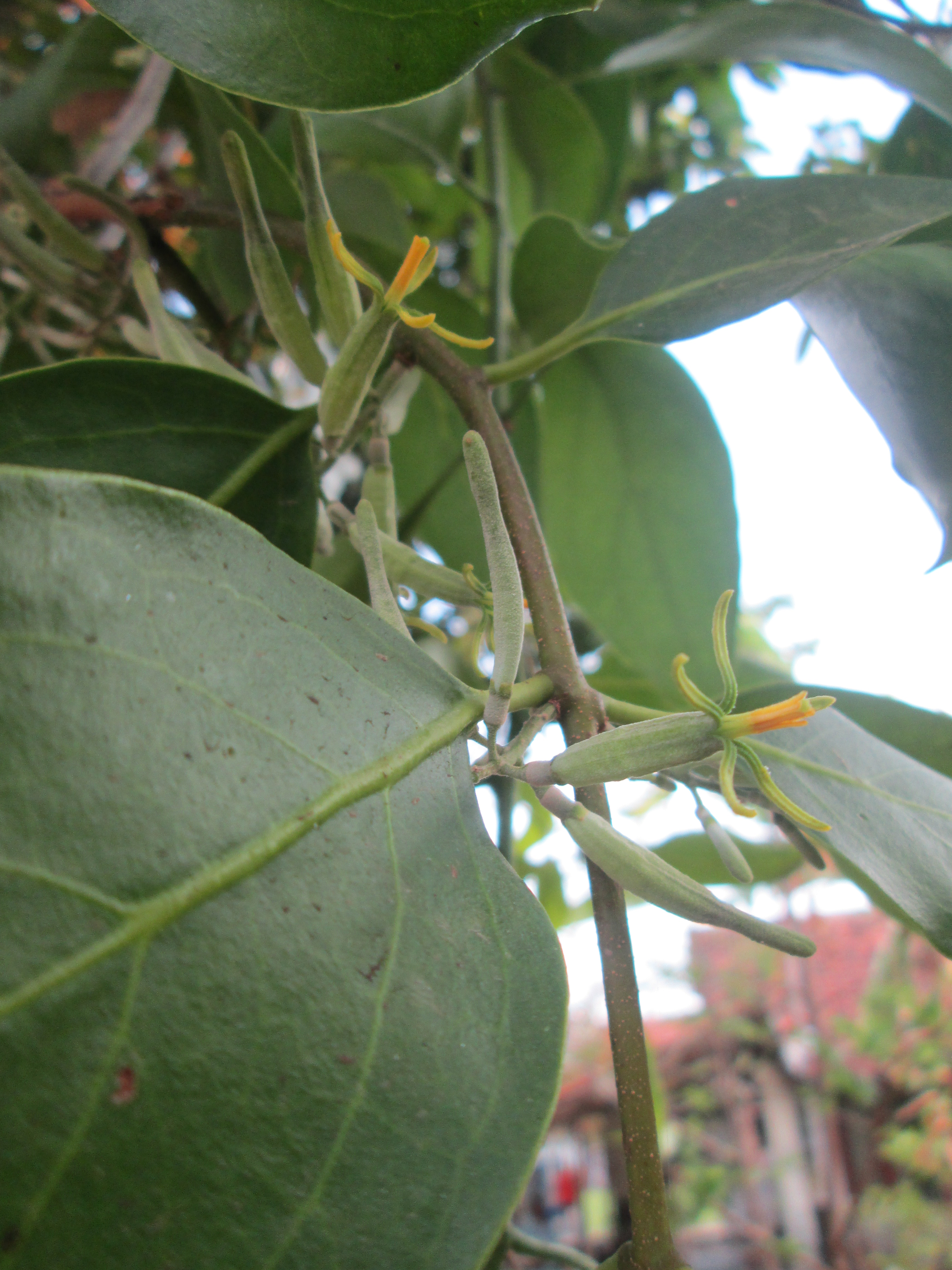
D. pentandra
