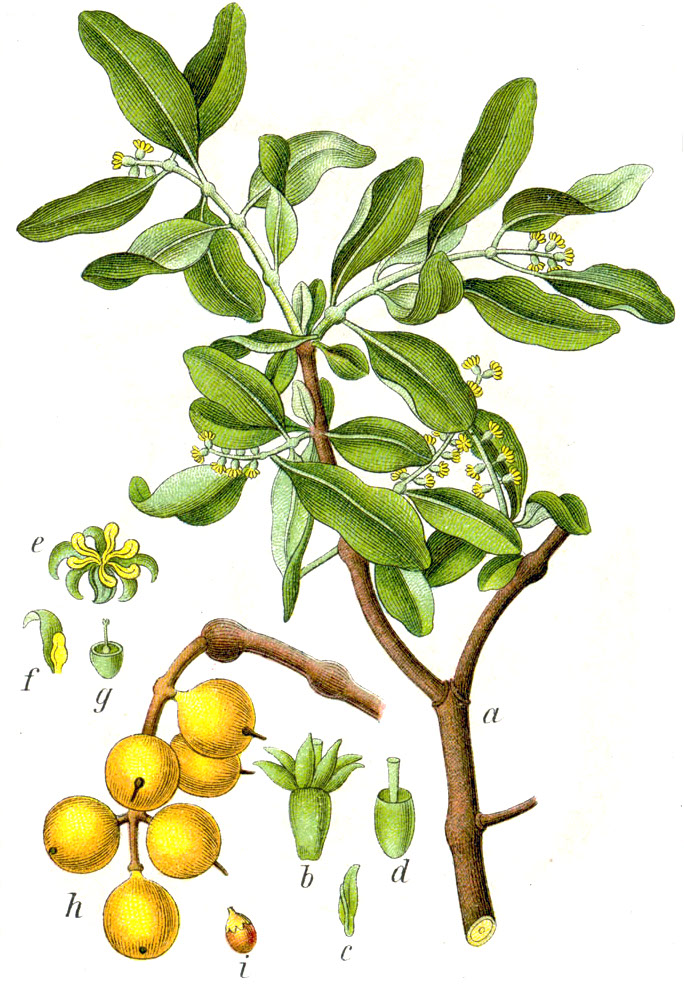
- Loranthus europaeus

Scientific classification
- Kingdom: Plantae
- Clade: Tracheophytes
- Clade: Angiosperms
- Clade: Eudicots
- Order: Santalales
- Family: Loranthaceae
- Genus: Loranthus; Jacq., nom. cons.

= Loranthus =

Genus of mistletoes

Loranthus is a genus of parasitic plants that grow on the branches of woody trees. It belongs to the family Loranthaceae, the showy mistletoe family. In most earlier systematic treatments it contains all mistletoe species with bisexual flowers, though some species have reverted to unisexual flowers. Other treatments restrict the genus to a few species. The systematic situation of Loranthus is not entirely clear.

The generic name in botanical Latin means strap-flower, in reference to the shape of the petals.

== Taxonomy ==
The taxonomic history of the generic name Loranthus is complicated. In 1753, Carl Linnaeus used the name Loranthus for a genus of one species, Loranthus americanus, which was thus the type species. He later added other species, including Loranthus scurrula in 1762, a species he had previously placed in a separate genus, Scurrula, and Loranthus europaeus in 1763, a name first used by Jacquin in 1762. However, Loranthus americanus has been included in Psittacanthus since that genus was first erected in 1830. Application of priority as set out in the International Code of Nomenclature for algae, fungi, and plants requires the name Loranthus to be used instead of Psittacanthus, with a different genus name used for the remaining species Linnaeus placed in Loranthus. To avoid altering established usage, the International Botanical Congress of 1930 decided to conserve Loranthus L. (1762), with the type species Loranthus scurrula, over Loranthus L. (1753). However, when Loranthus in this sense was split further, Loranthus scurrula was placed in the revived genus Scurrula. The conservation decision in 1930 meant that Loranthus should be used instead of Scurrula, and a different name used for Scurrula. Again to avoid altering established usage, a proposal was agreed in 1964 to conserve Loranthus Jacq. (1762), with the type species Loranthus europaeus, over Loranthus L. (1753).

=== Species ===
The number of species recognized in the genus Loranthus has varied widely. At one time it included almost all mistletoes. It was then split into many genera, leaving only L. europaeus from Europe eastwards and L. odoratus from tropical Asia. The Flora of China lists six species native to China (three endemic), stating that there are about ten species in total. Species recognized as of May 2015 are:

- Loranthus delavayi Tiegh.
- Loranthus europaeus Jacq.
- Loranthus guizhouensis H.X.Qiu
- Loranthus kaoi (J.M. Chao) H.S.Kiu
- Loranthus lambertianus Schult.f.
- Loranthus longiflorus Desr.
- Loranthus macrantherus (Eichler) Hemsl.
- Loranthus pseudo-odoratus Lingelsh.
- Loranthus pulverulentus Wall.
- Loranthus tanakae Franch. & Sav.

== Ecology ==
Some species of Loranthus, in the broad sense, are parasites on cultivated trees; for example, they occur in Kerala and Uttarakhand India on mango trees (Mangifera indica), sapota trees (Manilkara zapota) and poplar trees. The majority of the Anogeissus latifolia trees in the Biligirirangan Hills of Karnataka are infected by Loranthus species and in Africa, they are pests in cocoa plantations. These plants grow strongly on ageing trees particularly somewhere in the middle of old branches. Once established, they steal minerals and water, as well as block sunlight by covering the encroached place.

The flowers of Loranthus europaeus are small, green, usually have four to six parts, and may be either unisexual or bisexual. Other species of a broader Loranthus have very large, showy flowers, with blooms in bright colours. The fruits are berries, usually containing a single seed, that is dispersed by birds.

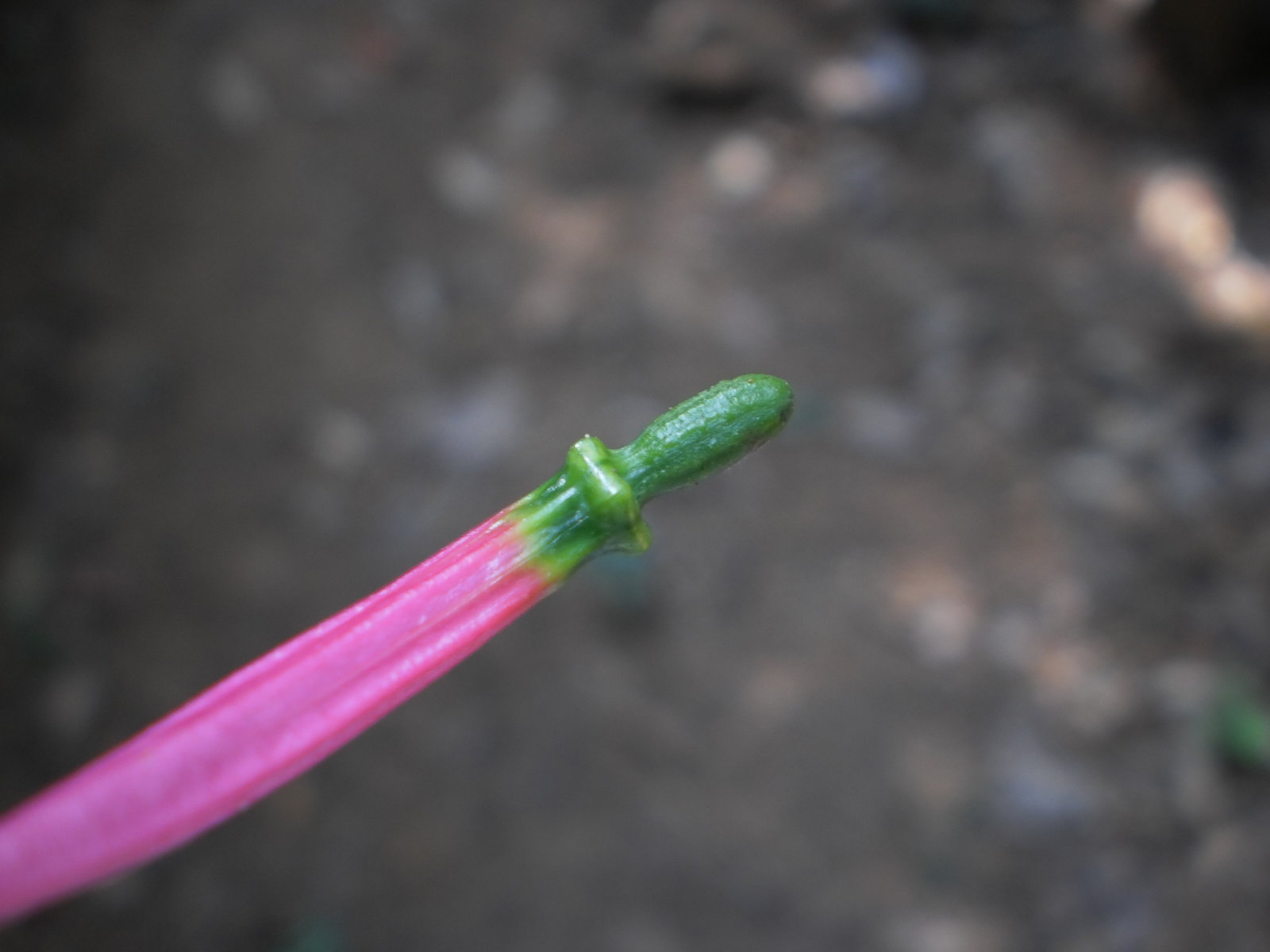
Loranthus flower found in Kerala

The floral characteristics indicate that it is ornithophilous in nature and has moderate quantity nectar stored in its perianth tube. The mature buds require external factors like tripping to ensure that they open up. In the absence of this, the buds fall off without opening. Birds help in this process and mature buds eject a cloud of pollens that sticks to the head or beak of the probing bird. The birds seen visiting these flowers in India are Tickell's flowerpecker, purple-rumped sunbird, purple sunbird and spider-hunter.

== Culture and religion ==
According to Pliny the Elder, the Celts considered "mistletoe" a remedy for barrenness in animals and an antidote to poison, and sacred when growing on oak trees. He describes a Celtic ritual sacrifice and banquet at which a druid dressed in white would climb an oak tree to collect mistletoe using a golden sickle. Modern botanists believe the described species in oak trees was Loranthus europaeus.

This legend is often referred to in the popular Asterix comic books, where the druid Getafix is often seen collecting mistletoe with a golden sickle (a golden billhook in the original French).

Modern druids in the Americas may use the native American Phoradendron leucarpum as well as other mistletoe species.
