= Sandpaper tree =

Sandpaper tree is a common name for several plants and may refer to:

- Curatella americana, native to northern South America, Central America, and the Caribbean
- Ehretia anacua, native to Texas and northeastern Mexico
- Ficus exasperata, native to Africa and Asia

== See also ==
- Sandpaper fig
