= Ficus carpentariensis =

Scientific classification
- Kingdom: Plantae
- Clade: Tracheophytes
- Clade: Angiosperms
- Clade: Eudicots
- Clade: Rosids
- Order: Rosales
- Family: Moraceae
- Genus: Ficus
- Species: F. carpentariensis

Binomial name
- Ficus carpentariensis D.J.Dixon

Synonyms
- Ficus castanea Elmer

Species of fig

Ficus carpentariensis is a species of fig tree, native to Australia. It is one of around thirteen Australian species in section Sycidium commonly referred to as Sandpaper figs. It is named after the Carpentaria region and was thought to be endemic to Northern Australia. It has since been reported that the species may be a collection of hybrid individuals and can occur anywhere the parent species Ficus aculeata and Ficus coronulata co occur, this includes the tropics of Western Australia and Northern Australia.
