= Watery fig =

Watery fig is a common name for several plants and may refer to:

- Ficus fraseri
- Ficus opposita
