= Leioproctus aquilus =

Scientific classification
- Kingdom: Animalia
- Phylum: Arthropoda
- Clade: Pancrustacea
- Class: Insecta
- Order: Hymenoptera
- Family: Colletidae
- Genus: Leioproctus
- Species: L. aquilus

Binomial name
- Leioproctus aquilus Maynard 2013

Species of bee

Leioproctus aquilus, or Leioproctus (Minycolletes) aquilus, is a species of bee in the family Colletidae and subfamily Colletinae. It is endemic to Australia. It was described by Australian entomologist Glynn Maynard in 2013.

== Etymology ==
The specific epithet aquilus (Latin: "dark-coloured") refers to the species’ appearance.

== Description ==
Female body length is about 7 mm, male body length 6 mm. Integumental colouration is mainly black to dark brown. The hair is white to black.

== Distribution and habitat ==
The species occurs in eastern inland Australia. The type locality is the Pilliga Scrub, 64 km south of Narrabri, on the North West Slopes of New South Wales.

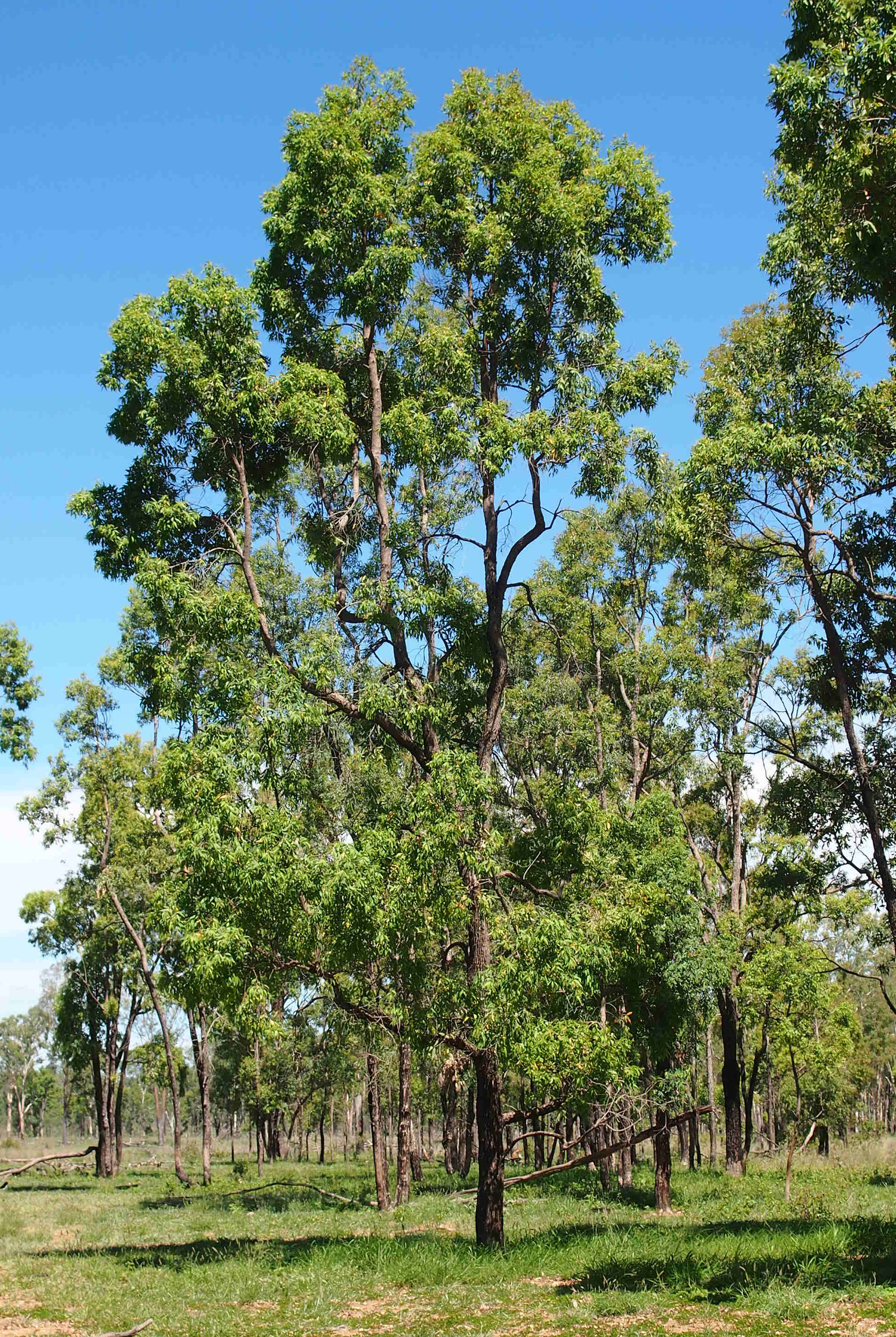
Angophora floribunda tree, a forage plant of the bees

== Behaviour ==
The adults are flying mellivores. Flowering plants visited by the bees include Astrotricha longifolia and Angophora floribunda.

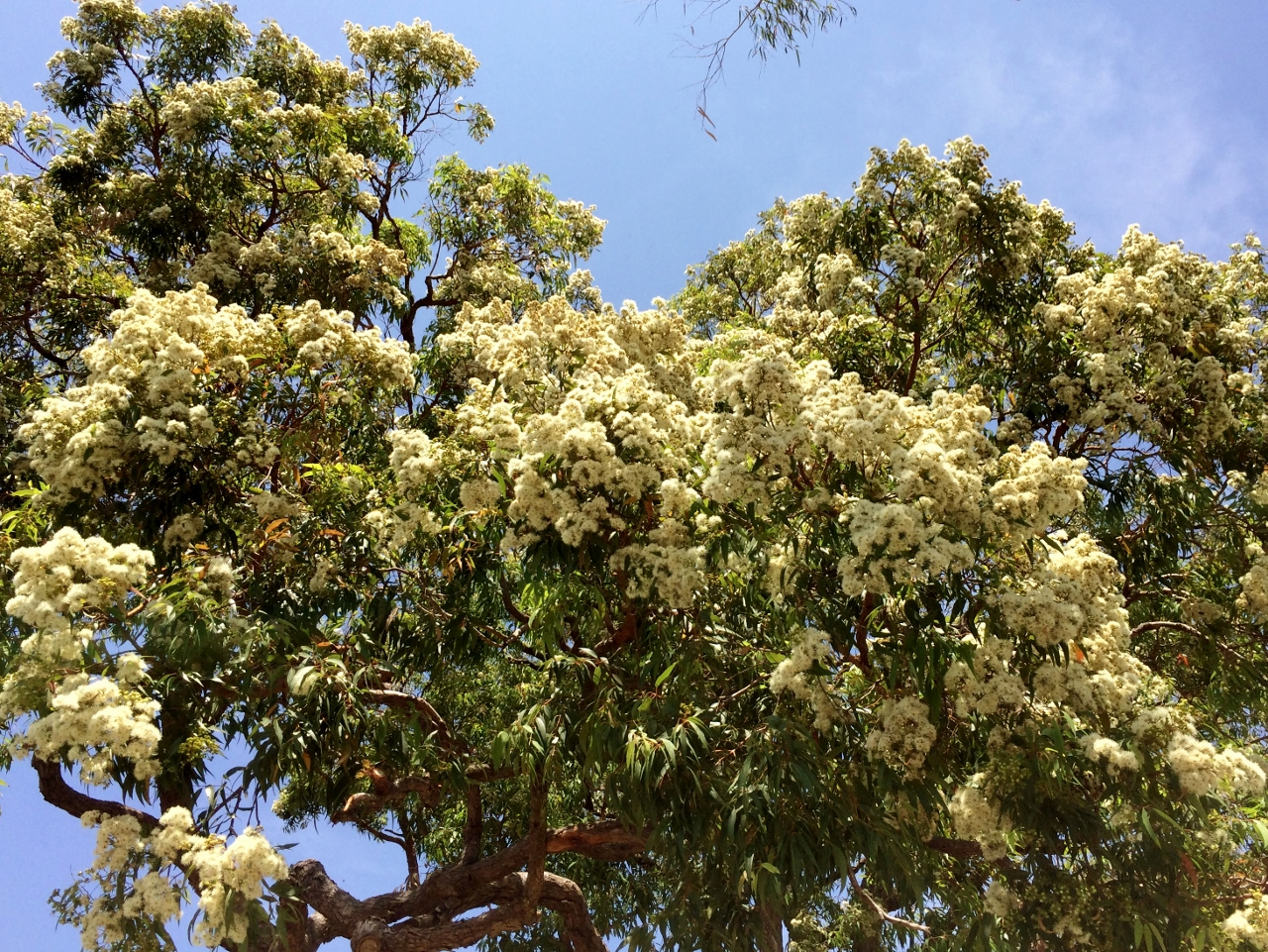
Inflorescence of Angophora floribunda (rough-barked apple)
