= Sandpaper fig =

The sandpaper figs are so named for their leaves, which are rough and sandpaper-like in texture. The common name may refer to a number of species in the genus Ficus:

Australian species:

- Ficus carpentariensis, possibly hybrid individuals
- Ficus coronata, creek sandpaper fig
- Ficus coronulata, crown, peach-leaf or river fig
- Ficus copiosa, sandpaper fig of New Guinea and northern Australia
- Ficus fraseri, white or shiny sandpaper fig
- Ficus leptoclada, Atherton sandpaper fig
- Ficus opposita, sweet sandpaper fig
- Ficus podocarpifolia
- Ficus scobina, sandpaper fig
- Ficus virgata

Others:

- Ficus capreifolia, river sandpaper fig
- Ficus exasperata, sandpaper forest fig
