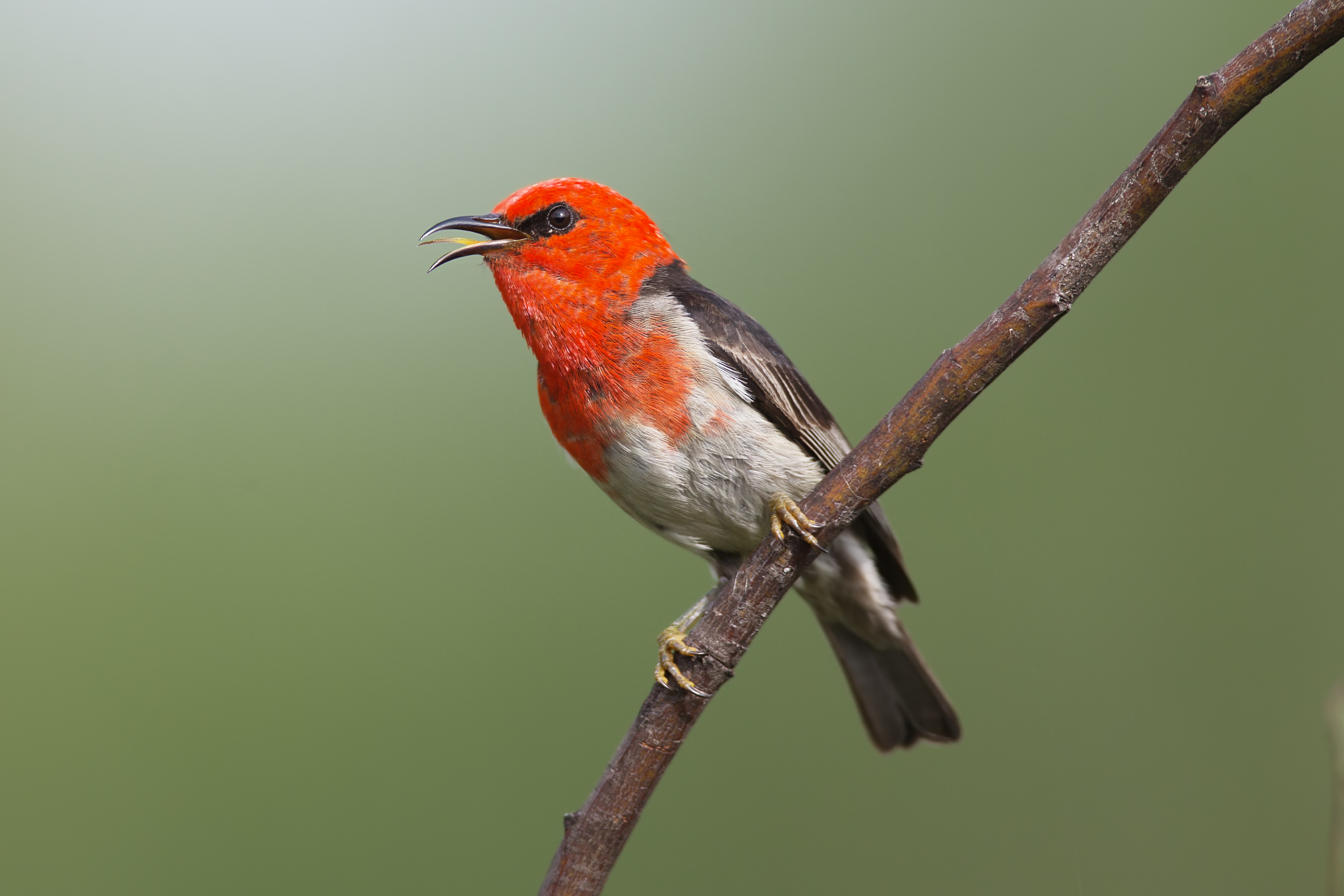
- Male
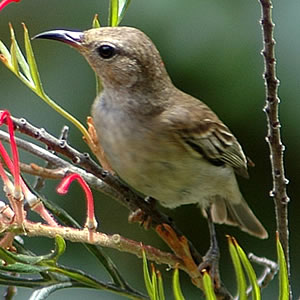
- Female

Conservation status
- Least Concern (IUCN 3.1)

Scientific classification
- Kingdom: Animalia
- Phylum: Chordata
- Class: Aves
- Order: Passeriformes
- Family: Meliphagidae
- Genus: Myzomela
- Species: M. sanguinolenta

Binomial name
- Myzomela sanguinolenta (Latham, 1801)
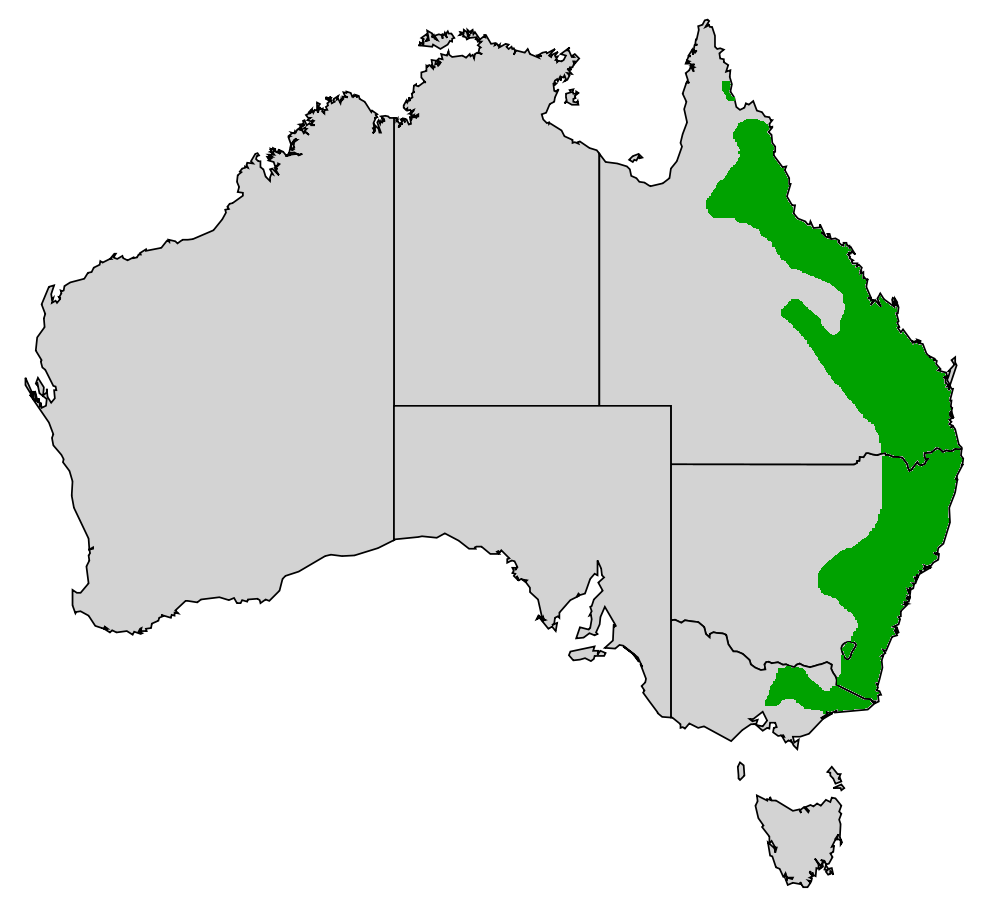
- Scarlet myzomela natural range

= Scarlet myzomela =

Species of bird

The scarlet myzomela or scarlet honeyeater (Myzomela sanguinolenta) is a small passerine bird of the honeyeater family Meliphagidae native to Australia. It was first described by English ornithologist John Latham in 1801. At 9 to 11 cm (3.5 to 4.3 in) long, it is the smallest honeyeater in Australia. It has a short tail and relatively long down-curved bill. It is sexually dimorphic; the male is a striking bright red with black wings, while the female is entirely brown. The species is more vocal than most honeyeaters, and a variety of calls have been recorded, including a bell-like tinkling.

The scarlet myzomela is found along most of the eastern coastline, from Cape York in far north Queensland to Gippsland in Victoria. It is migratory in the southern parts of its range, with populations moving north in the winter. Its natural habitat is forest, where it forages mainly in the upper tree canopy. It is omnivorous, feeding on insects as well as nectar. Up to three broods may be raised over the course of a breeding season. The female lays two or rarely three flecked white eggs in a 5 cm (2 in) diameter cup-shaped nest high in a tree. The International Union for Conservation of Nature (IUCN) has assessed it as being of least concern on account of its large range and apparently stable population.

== Taxonomy ==
The scarlet myzomela was depicted in three paintings in a set of early illustrations known as the Watling drawings, done in the first years of European settlement of Sydney between 1788 and 1794. Based on these, English ornithologist John Latham described it as three separate species in 1801. He based the description of Certhia sanguinolenta on an immature male moulting into adult plumage with incomplete red colouration, calling it the sanguineous creeper. In the same publication he described Certhia dibapha, the cochineal creeper, and C. erythropygia, the red-rumped creeper. English naturalist James Francis Stephens called it Meliphaga sanguinea in 1826 as a replacement name for Latham's Certhia sanguinolenta. John Gould determined Latham's three names to be the one species in 1843, adopting the first-written binomial name as the valid one and relegating the others to synonymy, though the name Myzomela dibapha was occasionally used, particularly in New Caledonia. In 1990, Ian McAllan proposed that the first drawing did not confirm the species identity and proposed the name Myzomela dibapha to hence be the oldest validly published name; however, Richard Schodde countered in 1992 that the drawing of an immature male could not be of any other species, meaning that M. sanguinolenta should stand. He added that the alternative proposed name had not been in use since the 1850s. The Wakolo myzomela, Sulawesi myzomela, Banda myzomela, and New Caledonian myzomela were all previously considered to be conspecific with the scarlet myzomela. There are no recognized subspecies nor regional variations; differences in observed plumage are due to wear after moulting.

This species is commonly known as the scarlet honeyeater in Australia and scarlet myzomela elsewhere, the latter name being adopted as the official name by the International Ornithological Committee (IOC). Gould used Latham's name of sanguineous honeyeater in the 19th century, which persisted into the early 20th century. Other common names are soldier-bird (as the male appears to wear a red coat) and blood-bird. An early colonial name was little soldier.

A 2004 genetic study of nuclear and mitochondrial DNA of honeyeaters found the scarlet myzomela to be most closely related to the cardinal myzomela, with their common ancestor diverging from a lineage that led to the red-headed myzomela, although only five of the thirty members of the genus Myzomela were analysed. A 2017 genetic study using both mitochondrial and nuclear DNA suggests that the ancestor of the scarlet myzomela diverged from that of the Banda myzomela around 2 million years ago, but the relationships of many species within the genus are uncertain. Molecular analysis has shown honeyeaters to be related to the Pardalotidae (pardalotes), Acanthizidae (Australian warblers, scrubwrens, thornbills, etc.), and the Maluridae (Australian fairy-wrens) in a large superfamily Meliphagoidea.

== Description ==
The smallest honeyeater native to Australia, the scarlet myzomela is a distinctive bird with a compact body, short tail and relatively long down-curved black bill and dark brown iris. It is between 9 and 11 cm (3.5 and 4.3 in) long, with an average wingspan of 18 cm (7.1 in) and a weight of 8 g (0.28 oz). It has relatively long wings for its size; when the wings are folded, the longest primary feathers reach over half the length of the tail. It exhibits sexual dimorphism, with the male much more brightly coloured than the female. The adult male has a bright red (scarlet) head, nape and upper breast, with a narrow black stripe from beak to eye and a thin black eye-ring. The red plumage extends as a central stripe down the back and rump. On its breast, the red becomes more mottled with grey towards the belly and flanks, which are grey-white. The sides of the breast are brown-black. The mantle and scapulars are black and the upperwing a dull black, with white edges to the secondary covert feathers. The tail is black above and dark grey below. The underwing is white with a dark grey trailing edge and tip. The female has a brown head and neck, darker on top and lighter and greyer on the sides, with a pale grey-brown throat and chin. It sometimes has pinkish or reddish patches on the forehead, throat and cheeks. The upperparts are brown, sometimes with scarlet patches on the uppertail coverts. The tail is blackish-brown with yellow fringes to all but the central pair of rectrices. The wings are blackish-brown. The female has a yellowish or brownish base to its black bill. Moulting takes place over spring and summer.

Young birds have juvenile plumage when they leave the nest; they are similar to females though with more reddish-brown upperparts, light brown rumps and uppertail coverts. Immature males, after moulting from juvenile plumage, have patches of red feathers coming through the juvenile brown plumage. Immature females are very difficult to distinguish from juveniles or adult females. Both sexes attain adult plumage after two moults. It is unknown whether its plumage changes with moults after the scarlet myzomela attains adulthood.

The scarlet myzomela is more commonly heard than seen, and has a wider repertoire of notes in its calls than most honeyeaters. The male is more vocal than the female. The main call is a tuneful tinkling call made up of sets of six notes that rise or fall in tone. It has been likened to cork being rubbed on glass. The female chirps as it hops around and upon meeting and playing with the male, and it can also make a squeaking call. Both sexes make a short chiew-chiew as a contact call.

Males could be mistaken for the similar looking red-headed myzomela in eastern Cape York Peninsula in northern Queensland where their ranges overlap, though the latter's red colouration is restricted to the head and is sharply demarcated. The latter species also lives in mangroves rather than woodlands. The dusky myzomela resembles the female scarlet myzomela, but is larger with a longer bill and tail, has much darker brown plumage, and lacks the pink tinge to the face and throat.

== Distribution and habitat ==
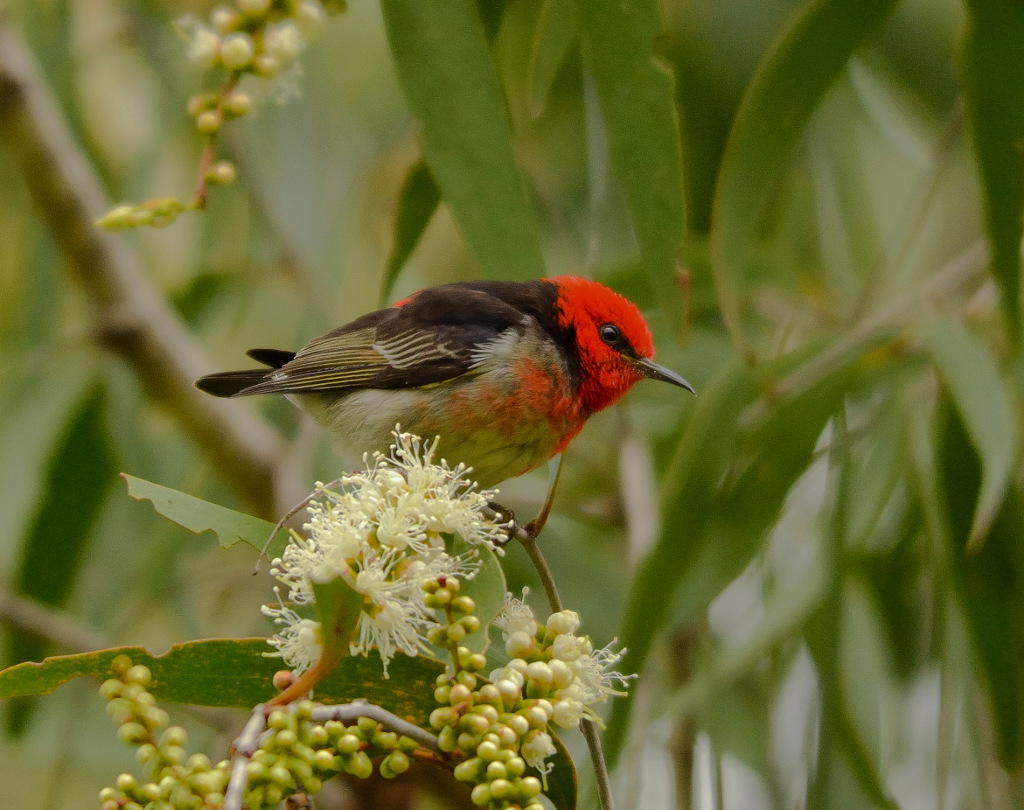
Adult male foraging at Melaleuca flowers in Queensland

The scarlet myzomela is found from Cooktown in Far North Queensland down the east coast to Mitchell River National Park in Gippsland, Victoria. It is rarer south of the Hacking River in New South Wales. Its range extends inland to Charters Towers, Carnarvon Gorge and Inglewood in Queensland, and the Warrumbungles in New South Wales. It is a rare vagrant to Melbourne.

The species' movements are not well known, but it appears to be migratory in the southern part of its range and more sedentary in the north. Populations of scarlet myzomelas move northwards up a portion of the Australian east coast for winter. Nomadic movements of populations, generally following the flowering of preferred food plants, also occur. Population numbers have been reported as fluctuating in some areas, with local movements possibly related to the flowering of preferred food plants. Local irruptions have occurred in Sydney in 1902 (during a drought), 1981, 1991 (both in northwestern Sydney), and 1994 (centred on Lane Cove River valley), in Nowra in 1980, across southern Victoria in 1985, and in the Eurobodalla district in 1991 and 1993. A field study in Mangerton over 18 years found that scarlet myzomelas arrived in the area in early spring (August) and left by November, though they were entirely absent in three separate years. The maximum age recorded from banding has been just over 10 years, in a bird caught south of Mount Cotton in Queensland.

Its habitat is dry sclerophyll forest and woodland, generally with eucalypts as the dominant trees and where there is little understory. Scarlet myzomelas are encountered alone, in pairs, or in small troops, sometimes with other honeyeaters in the canopy of trees in flower.

== Behaviour ==
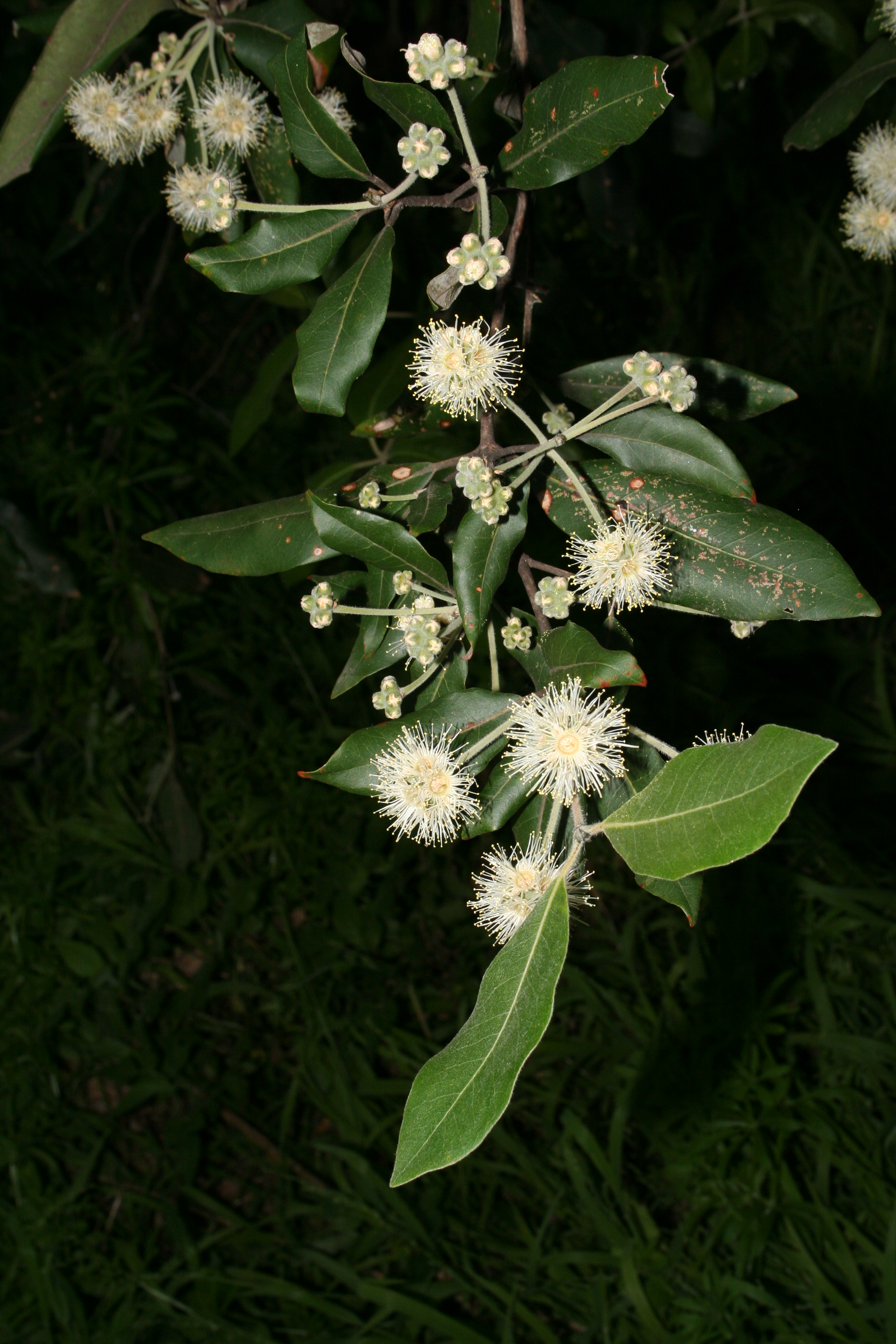
Turpentine (Syncarpia glomulifera), a commonly-foraged tree

The scarlet myzomela is territorial, with males advertising their territories by singing from the tops of trees. They compete with members of the same species, and are usually driven away from some feeding areas by hungry larger honeyeaters, such as Lewin's, New Holland, white-naped, and brown honeyeaters, as well as eastern spinebills and noisy friarbirds. In particular, breeding New Holland honeyeaters actively drive off scarlet myzomelas.

=== Breeding ===
The species breeds from winter through to summer, generally beginning around July or August and winding up in January. There have been odd records of nesting in April or May. A pair generally raises one or two broods a year. Nest failures may lead to a third brood, with females able to lay eggs around three weeks after the previous young have fledged. The nest consists of a tiny cup of shredded bark with spider web as binding, high up in the tree canopy, or even in mistletoe. Trees with dense foliage, such as lillypilly (Syzygium smithii), Pittosporum species, turpentine (Syncarpia glomulifera), mangroves, species of paperbark, eucalypts or wattles (Acacia spp.) are more often chosen as nesting sites.

The nest is around 5 cm (2.0 in) in diameter, and takes around 8 days to build before eggs are laid in it. Both sexes build the nest, though some observations have the male doing the bulk of construction and others the female. Alfred J. North observed that the females alone collected nesting material, such as spiderwebs and bark, tearing bark off such trees as the rough-barked apple (Angophora floribunda). The clutch size is mostly two but occasionally three eggs. Measuring 16 mm (0.63 in) long and 12.1 mm (0.48 in) wide, the small eggs are white with the larger end flecked with dull red-brown or grey-purple. Eggs are laid a day apart, and the female is thought to incubate the eggs alone. The young are born naked, but are soon covered in down. They spend 11–12 days in the nest before fledging. Both parents feed their young.

=== Feeding ===
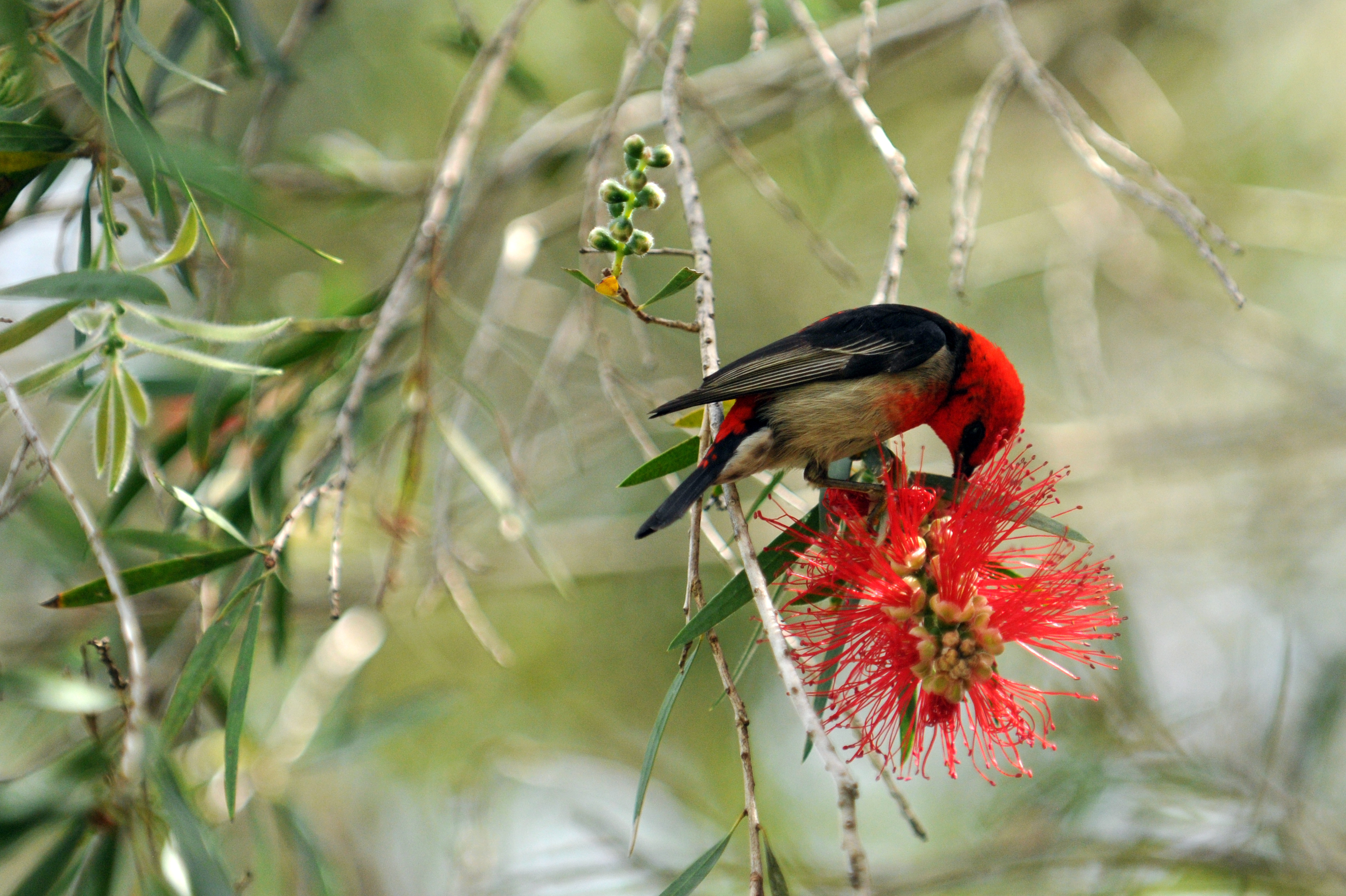
Scarlet honeyeater feeding on flowering Callistemon in Mallacoota, Victoria

The scarlet myzomela is arboreal, foraging in the crowns of trees, darting from flower to flower, probing for nectar with its long curved bill. It sometimes hovers in front of flowers while feeding. Trees visited include turpentine (Syncarpia glomulifera), paperbarks (Melaleuca spp.), and banksias. The scarlet myzomela is omnivorous, and also feeds on insects as well as nectar, sallying for flying insects in the canopy. Insects eaten include beetles, flies, bugs, and caterpillars.

== Conservation status ==
The scarlet myzomela is listed as being a species of least concern by the IUCN, on account of its large range (1,960,000 square km) and stable population, with no evidence of any significant decline.

== Aviculture ==
Scarlet myzomelas are rarely seen in aviculture, though they have been kept by enthusiasts in Sydney. As all honeyeaters are territorial, they tend to be aggressive in mixed-species aviaries. Various state regulations govern the keeping of the species; in South Australia, for instance, a Specialist Licence is required, while in New South Wales a Class B2 (Advanced Bird) licence is required. Applicants for the New South Wales B2 licence must have at least two years' experience keeping birds, and be able to demonstrate that they can provide the appropriate care and housing for the species they wish to obtain.
