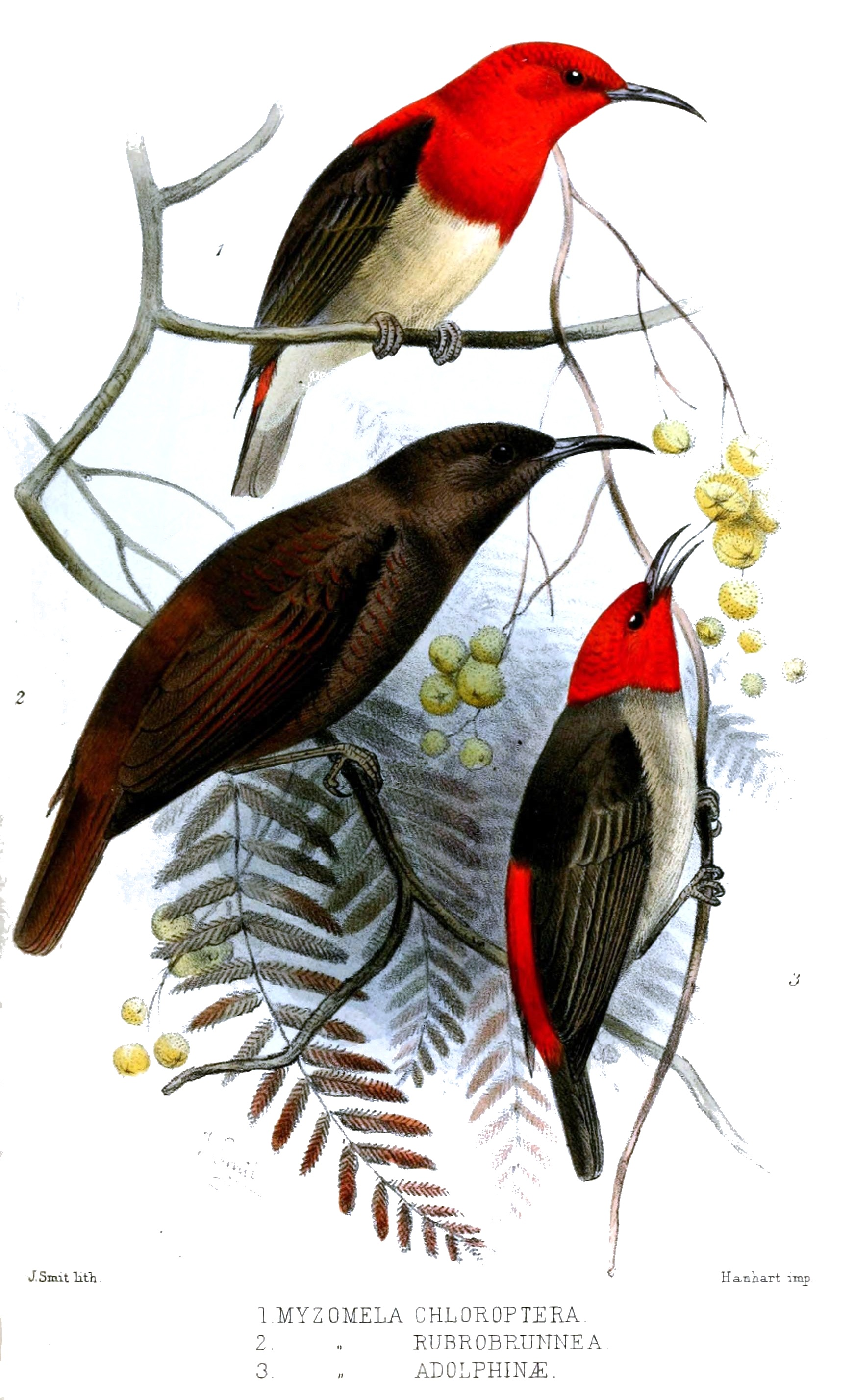
- Bottom left. Illustration by Joseph Smit.

Conservation status
- Least Concern (IUCN 3.1)

Scientific classification
- Domain: Eukaryota
- Kingdom: Animalia
- Phylum: Chordata
- Class: Aves
- Order: Passeriformes
- Family: Meliphagidae
- Genus: Myzomela
- Species: M. rubrobrunnea

Binomial name
- Myzomela rubrobrunnea Meyer, 1874

= Biak myzomela =

Species of bird

The Biak myzomela (Myzomela rubrobrunnea) is a species of bird in the family Meliphagidae. It was formerly considered a subspecies of the dusky myzomela ( Myzomela obscura), but was split as a distinct species by the IOC in 2021. It is found in Biak. Its natural habitat is subtropical or tropical moist lowland forests.
