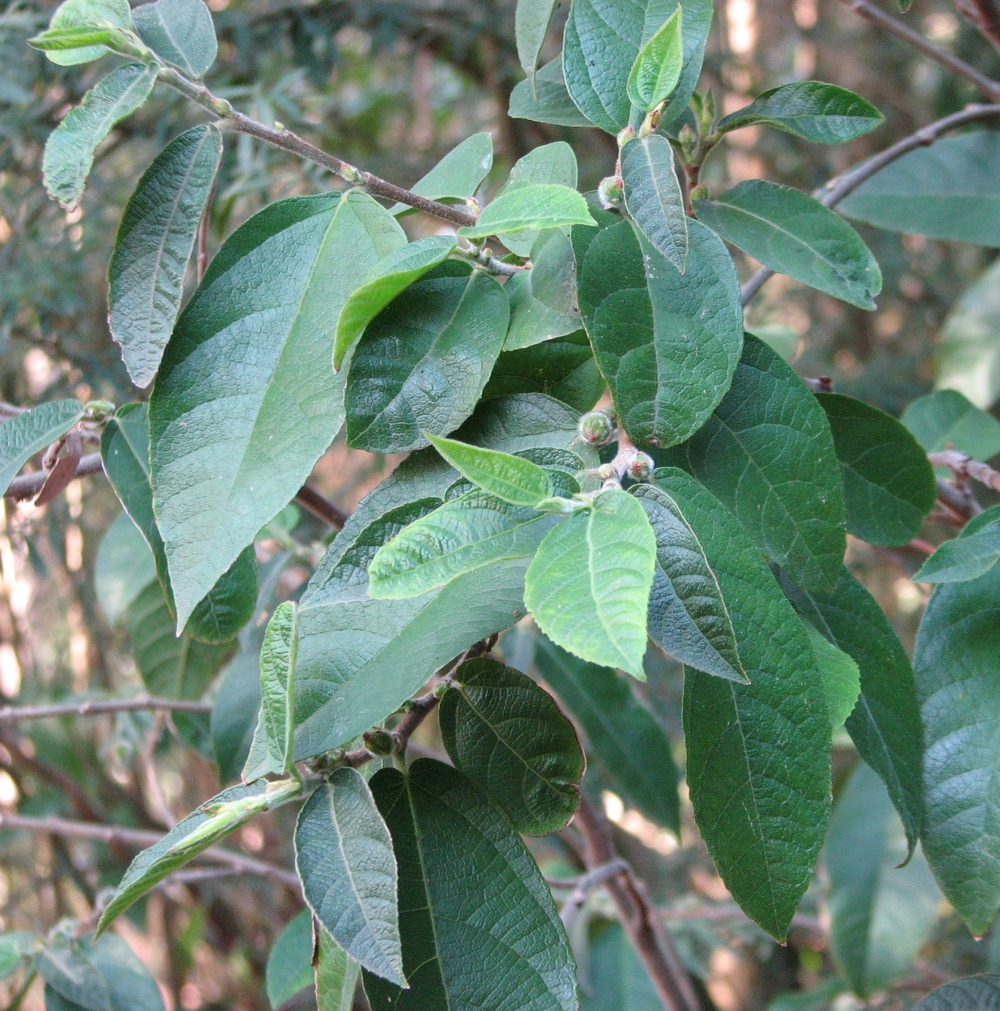

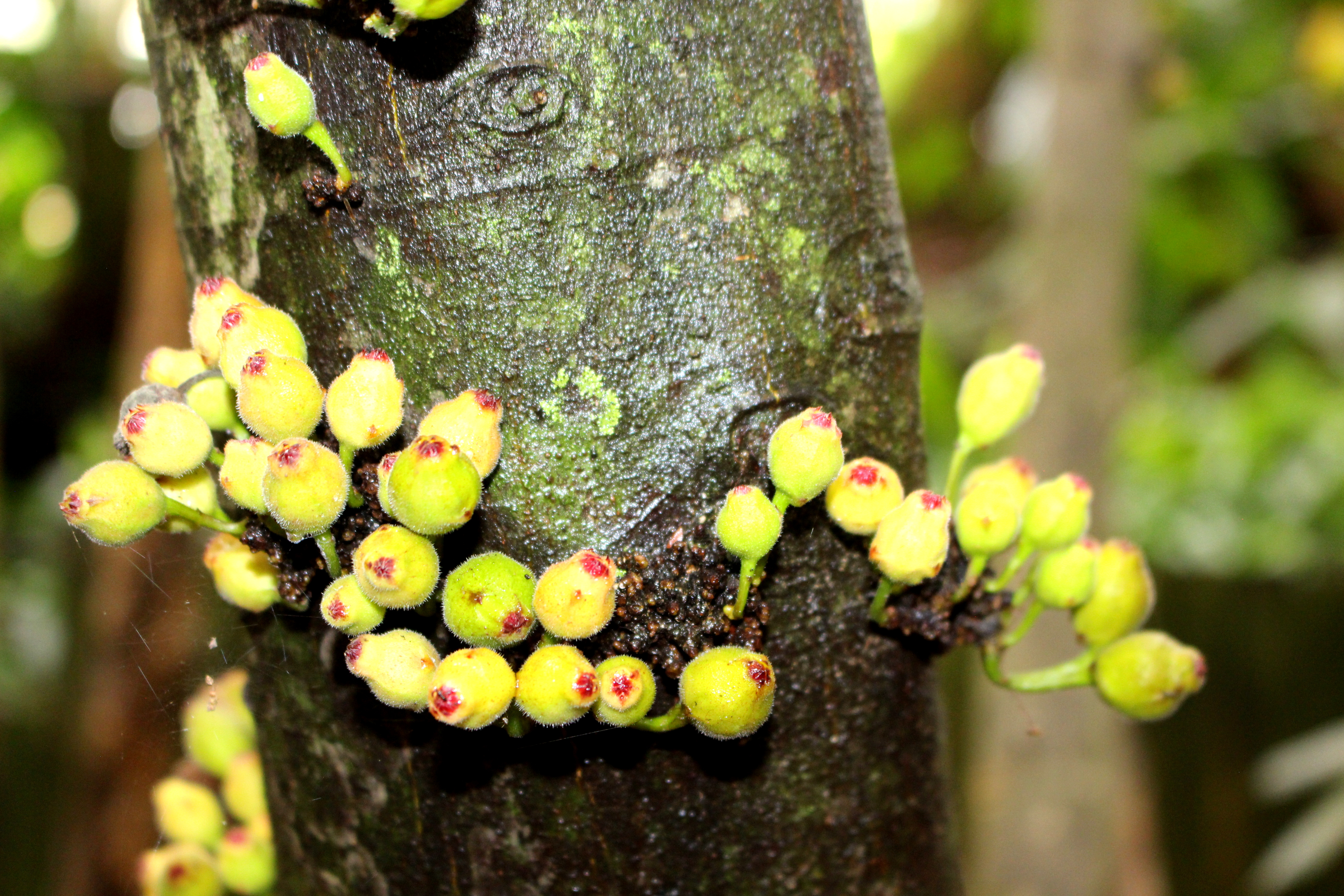
- Fruit demonstrating cauliflory

Conservation status
- Least Concern (IUCN 3.1)

Scientific classification
- Kingdom: Plantae
- Clade: Tracheophytes
- Clade: Angiosperms
- Clade: Eudicots
- Clade: Rosids
- Order: Rosales
- Family: Moraceae
- Genus: Ficus
- Subgenus: F. subg. Sycidium
- Species: F. coronata

Binomial name
- Ficus coronata Spin
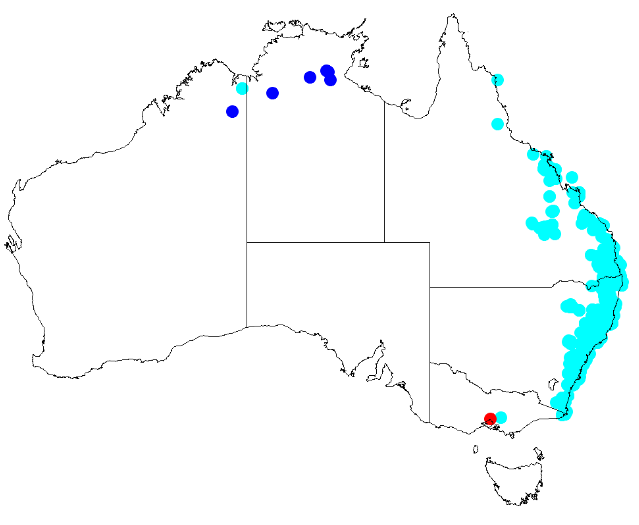
- Occurrence data from AVH :blue dots represent detected outliers; red dots cultivated plants; and cyan dots points not tagged in either way

Synonyms
- Ficus muntia Link; Ficus scabrifolia A.Rich.; Ficus stephanocarpa Warb.

= Ficus coronata =

Species of fig

Ficus coronata, commonly known as the sandpaper fig or creek sandpaper fig, is a cauliflorous species of fig tree, native to Australia. It is found along the east coast from Mackay in Central Queensland, through New South Wales and just into Victoria near Mallacoota. It grows along river banks and gullies in rainforest and open forest. Its common name is derived from its rough sandpapery leaves, which it shares with the other sandpaper figs.

== Taxonomy ==
Ficus coronata was first described by the Italian Marquese di Spigno in 1818. Its specific epithet the Latin coronata "crowned", referring to a ring of bristles around the apex of the fruit. Ficus stephanocarpa (also meaning 'crowned fruit') as described by the German botanist Otto Warburg is a synonym.

== Description ==
The sandpaper fig is a small tree which may reach the dimensions of 6–12 m (20–39 ft) tall by 3–5 m (9.8–16.4 ft) wide, although is generally smaller. The trunk is dark brown, and the ovate or elliptical leaves are 5–15 cm (2.0–5.9 in) long by 2–5 cm (0.79–1.97 in) wide and very scabrous (rough) like sandpaper on the upper side. The new growth is hairy. The succulent oval fruit is around 1.5 cm (0.59 in) long and covered in dense hairs.

== Distribution and habitat ==
The sandpaper fig is found along watercourses and gullies in rainforest, and less commonly in open forest. It may be associated with the rough-barked apple (Angophora floribunda). It is found on limestone outcrops in Kanangra-Boyd National Park. It is found from Mackay southwards through New South Wales and into eastern Victoria where it is listed as "threatened" under the Flora and Fauna Guarantee Act 1988.

A study showed the species has recently expanded into south eastern New South Wales and into Victoria.

== Ecology ==
Ficus coronata serves as a food plant for the caterpillars of the Queensland butterflies, the common- or purple moonbeam (Philiris innotatus) and the common crow (Euploea core). The Australasian figbird (Sphecotheres vieilloti), green catbird (Ailuroedus crassirostris), olive-backed oriole (Oriolus sagittatus), topknot pigeon (Lopholaimus antarcticus), and grey-headed flying fox (Pteropus poliocephalus) are among those animals who consume the fruit.

== Uses ==
The fruit is edible and palatable, and was consumed by local Aboriginal people.

A popular story holds that the fig's leaves were used as sandpaper for polishing wood or turtle shells by indigenous people. Bonsai and fig enthusiast Len Webber stated they were too brittle and soft to function in this fashion, but a more recent example found they did work.

The sandpaper fig's leaves are an attractive attribute which may be highlighted with bonsai, although the trunk may not thicken spontaneously. It is suited to a shady position in gardens, or medium to brightly lit indoor spaces. Like all figs in garden situations, they attract birds, such as species of silvereye and rainforest pigeon.
