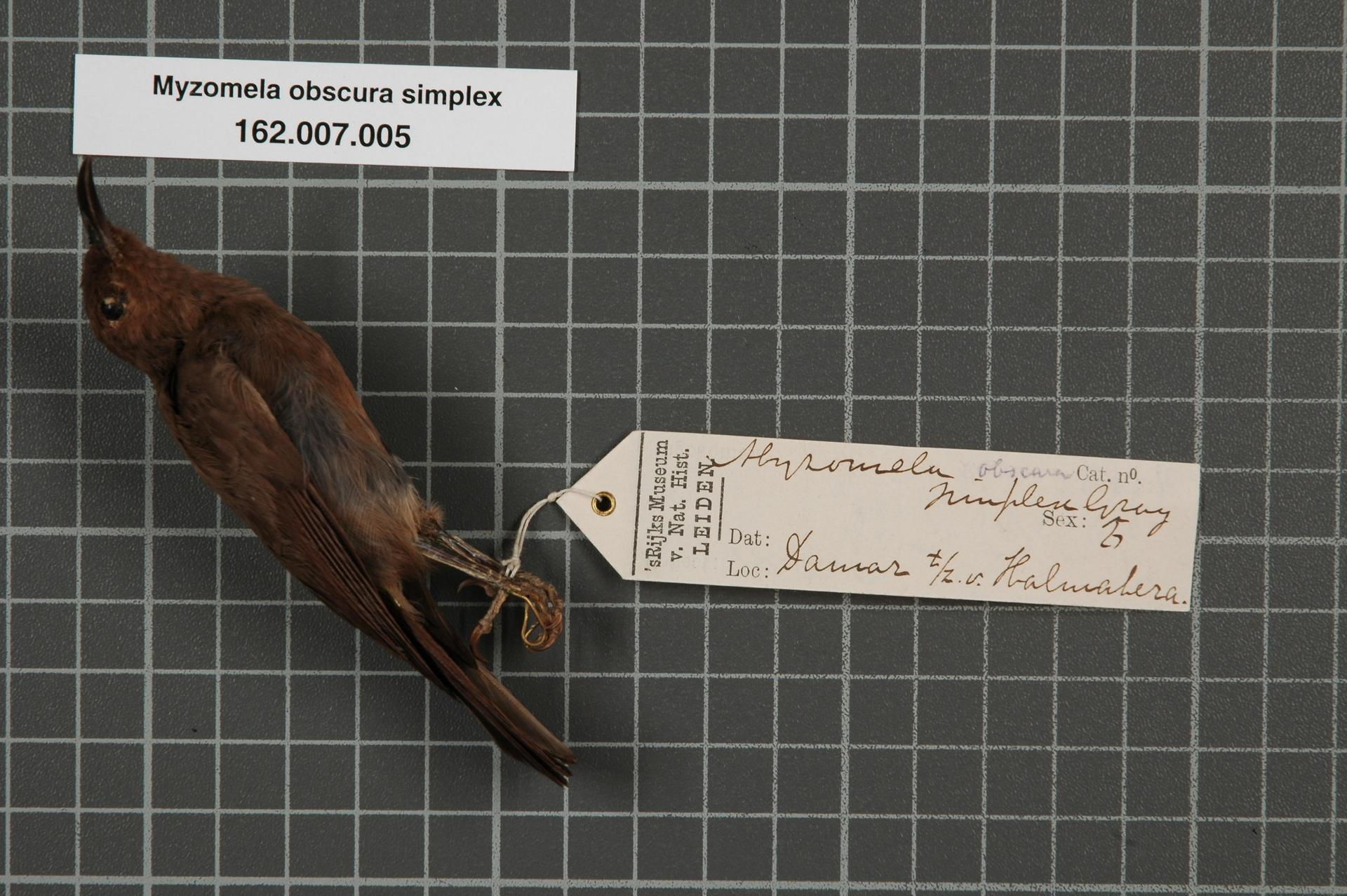
- Preserved specimen at Naturalis Biodiversity Center

Conservation status
- Least Concern (IUCN 3.1)

Scientific classification
- Domain: Eukaryota
- Kingdom: Animalia
- Phylum: Chordata
- Class: Aves
- Order: Passeriformes
- Family: Meliphagidae
- Genus: Myzomela
- Species: M. simplex

Binomial name
- Myzomela simplex GR Gray, 1861

= Moluccan myzomela =

Species of bird

The Moluccan myzomela (Myzomela simplex) is a species of bird in the family Meliphagidae. It is endemic to Indonesia, where it is found on the Maluku Islands. Its natural habitat is subtropical or tropical moist lowland forests.

It was formerly considered a subspecies of the dusky myzomela (Myzomela obscura), but phylogenetic evidence indicates that both are distinct species, and it has thus been split by the IUCN Red List, BirdLife International, and the International Ornithologists' Union.

There are two recognized subspecies:

- M. s. mortyana - endemic to Morotai
- M. s. simplex - found on Halmahera, Ternate, Tidore, Damar, and the Bacan Islands
