= Ficus scobina =

Conservation status
- Least Concern (IUCN 3.1)

Scientific classification
- Kingdom: Plantae
- Clade: Tracheophytes
- Clade: Angiosperms
- Clade: Eudicots
- Clade: Rosids
- Order: Rosales
- Family: Moraceae
- Genus: Ficus
- Species: F. scobina

Binomial name
- Ficus scobina Benth.

Species of Ficus plant

Ficus scobina is one of several fig species commonly known as sandpaper fig. Ficus scobina is a small tree that grows to a height of 3–8 metres (9.8–26.2 ft). It is native to northern Australia, from the Kimberleys in northern Western Australia to Arnhem Land in the Northern Territory. It grows in monsoon forest, typically near streams, up to 250 metres elevation.

The species was described by George Bentham in 1873.
