= Red-tinged myzomela =

Conservation status
- Least Concern (IUCN 3.1)

Scientific classification
- Domain: Eukaryota
- Kingdom: Animalia
- Phylum: Chordata
- Class: Aves
- Order: Passeriformes
- Family: Meliphagidae
- Genus: Myzomela
- Species: M. rubrotincta

Binomial name
- Myzomela rubrotincta Salvadori, 1878

Species of bird

The red-tinged myzomela (Myzomela rubrotincta) is a species of bird in the family Meliphagidae. It was formerly considered a subspecies of the dusky myzomela (Myzomela obscura), but was split as a distinct species by the IOC in 2021. It is found in the Obi Islands of Indonesia. Its natural habitat is subtropical or tropical moist lowland forests.
