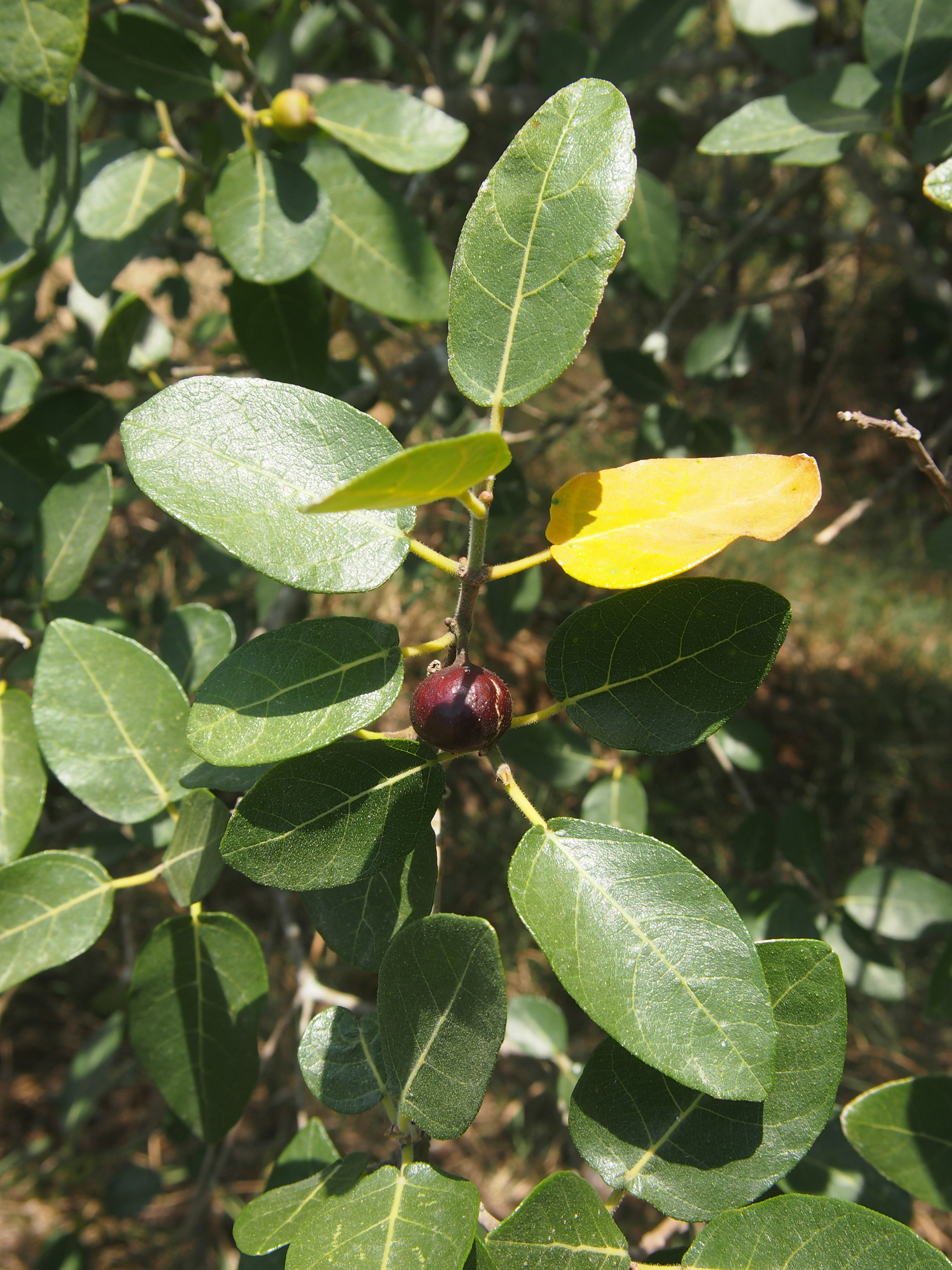

Conservation status
- Least Concern (IUCN 3.1)

Scientific classification
- Kingdom: Plantae
- Clade: Embryophytes
- Clade: Tracheophytes
- Clade: Angiosperms
- Clade: Eudicots
- Clade: Rosids
- Order: Rosales
- Family: Moraceae
- Genus: Ficus
- Subgenus: F. subg. Sycidium
- Species: F. opposita

Binomial name
- Ficus opposita Miq.

Synonyms
- Ficus androbrota Summerh.; Ficus apolepomena Summerh.; Ficus branderhorstii Diels; Ficus conjugata Miq.; Ficus cumingii var. androbrota (Summerh.) Corner; Ficus dichroa Summerh.; Ficus fitzalanii Miq.; Ficus radula Banks ex Hiern, nom. illeg. homonym. post.; Ficus xerophila Domin; Ficus yarrabensis Domin

= Ficus opposita =

Sweet sandpaper fig

Species of fig

Ficus opposita is one of several fig species commonly known as sandpaper figs. Other common names include sweet sandpaper fig, sweet fig and the ambiguous "figwood" and "watery fig". It is native to New Guinea, the Indonesian island of Java, and to Queensland in Australia.

It grows as either a shrub or small tree. As the figs ripen, their colour changes from green to yellow to reddish-brown and finally, to black. The fruit is edible and palatable, tastier than most other fig species.

It serves as a food plant for the caterpillars of the Queensland butterfly the common- or purple moonbeam (Philiris innotatus).

The leaves on this plant can treat skin infections such as tinea.

Shown to hybridise with Ficus coronulata.
