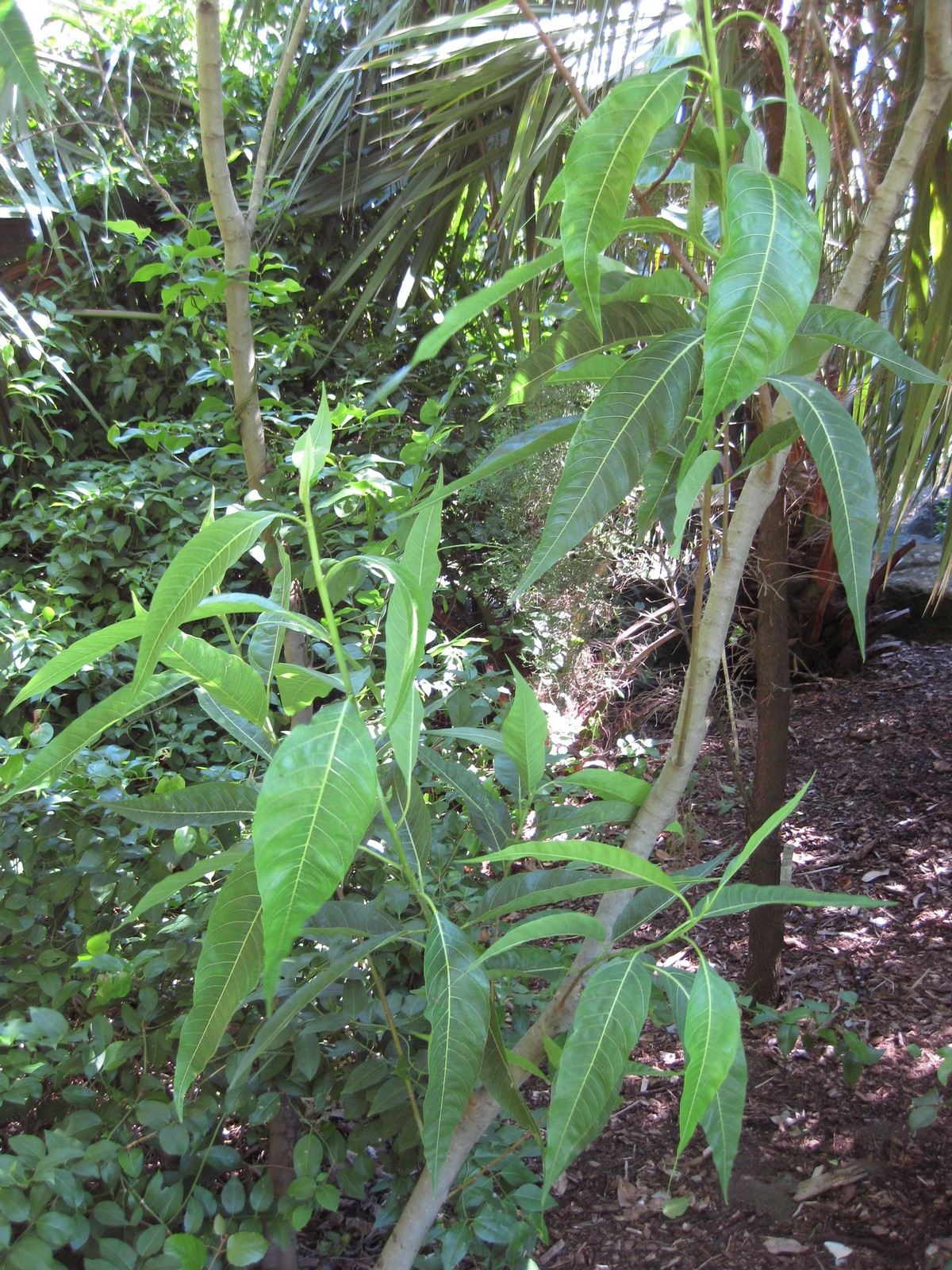

Conservation status
- Least Concern (IUCN 3.1)

- Least Concern (TPWCA)

Scientific classification
- Kingdom: Plantae
- Clade: Tracheophytes
- Clade: Angiosperms
- Clade: Eudicots
- Clade: Rosids
- Order: Rosales
- Family: Moraceae
- Genus: Ficus
- Species: F. coronulata

Binomial name
- Ficus coronulata Miq.
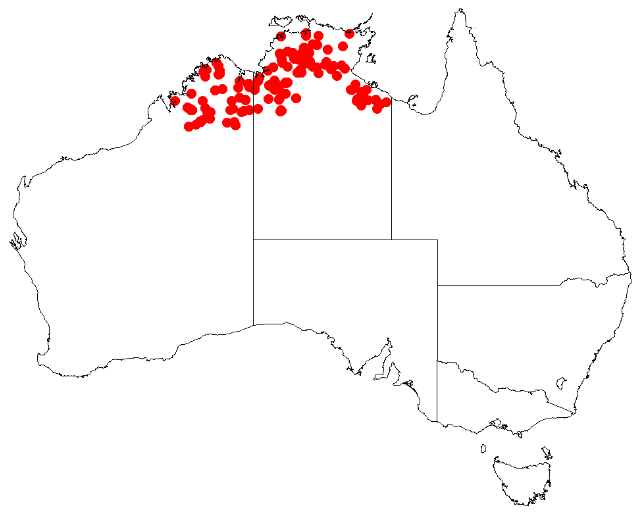
- Occurrence data from AVH

Synonyms
- Ficus salicina F.Muell.

= Ficus coronulata =

Species of fig

Ficus coronulata, commonly known as the peach-leaf fig, and in the Northern Territory as river fig and crown fig, is one of several fig species commonly known as sandpaper figs. It is native to Western Australia and the Northern Territory.

== Description ==
Ficus coronulata is a tree growing up to 15 m (50 ft) tall. It is dioecious. Its twigs hang down, are from 0.9–5.4 mm (0.04–0.21 in) in diameter, and have glassy hairs lying close to the twig (appressed), with the twigs becoming smooth with age. The leaf stem is 13–34 mm (0.5–1.3 in) long and 0.9–2.1 mm (0.04–0.08 in) in diameter, and is rough to the touch (or with scattered ascending glassy hairs), and deeply channelled on the upper surface. The leaves are alternate but occasionally opposite. They are narrowly elliptic or lanceolate in shape, and have a recurved entire margin. The leaf tip gradually tapers to a point apex acuminate, and the base of the leaf is wedge-shaped. The leaf dimensions are 50–333 mm long and 12–105 mm wide. The leaf surfaces is lightly rough to the touch (scabrid), occasionally with scattered appressed glassy hairs on the lower surface. The leaves also have cystoliths (hard stony structures) which are visible as raised opaque dots on upper surface. The lateral veins occur in 20–46 pairs. Stipules are lateral (occasionally interpetiolar) and are up to 21 mm long, with scattered appressed glassy hairs, and have ciliolate margins which lose their hairs. The fruit (syconia occur in the leaf axils, are globular, and up to 21 mm long and 21 mm in diameter, and they too are lightly rough to the touch. The ostiole protrudes into a crown with numerous ciliolate bracts (bracts with "eyelashes"), and is green to yellowish green at maturity. The peduncle is 21 mm long, 0.6-1.0 mm in diameter. There are three bracts at the base of up to 4 mm in length, with appressed glassy hairs, and the margins have minute hairs (cilia) which persist. Male florets are ostiolar in up to 4 rows, on stems with 4 or 5 tepals with cilia ("eyelashes") and each with one or two stamens. The female and gall florets are generally without stems (sessile), with 5 ciliolate (with "eyelashes") tepals. Interfloral bracts are absent.

In the Northern Territory it has been found flowering in January, March, May, June, July, September, October and November, and it fruits all year round.

It is not usually confused with other fig species, being distinctive by the green (or yellowish-green) of its mature syconia, and by its narrowly elliptic or lanceolate leaves. It is not a strangling fig.

== Taxonomy ==
It was first described in 1862, by Friedrich Anton Wilhelm Miquel from a specimen found in 1855 in Arnhemsland (Arnhem Land) by Ferdinand von Mueller.

== Distribution and habitat ==
In the Northern Territory it is found in the bioregions: Arnhem Coast, Arnhem Plateau, Central Arnhem, Central Kimberley, Daly Basin, Darwin Coastal, Gulf Coastal, Gulf Fall and Uplands, Northern Kimberley, Ord Victoria Plain, Pine Creek, Sturt Plateau, and Victoria Bonaparte. In Western Australia it is found in the bioregions: Central Kimberley, Dampierland, Northern Kimberley, Ord Victoria Plain, and Victoria Bonaparte.

It is found along rivers and creeks. It has been recorded as a host plant for the mistletoe species Amyema benthamii. Shown to hybridise with Ficus aculeata.

== Aboriginal names ==
For the aboriginal language group, Jaminjung, it is Ngaliwurru and Nungali; for the Garnimbi it is Jabawi; for the Mangarrayi and Yangman it is Garranba; for the Ngarinyman it is Jabawi; and for the Wagiman it is mardengdeng and dengdengin.

== Uses ==
Ficus coronulata is used both as medicine and as food by many indigenous groups across the Northern Territory, and the Jawoyn also use it for making fire-sticks. Indigenous people could feed themselves and toss fruit in the river to attract turtles, which they would then catch.

Rarely cultivated, Ficus coronulata has potential as a specimen tree in parks and gardens. It is also used as an herbicide. It is known for its debilitating effects on humans if accidentally ingested.
