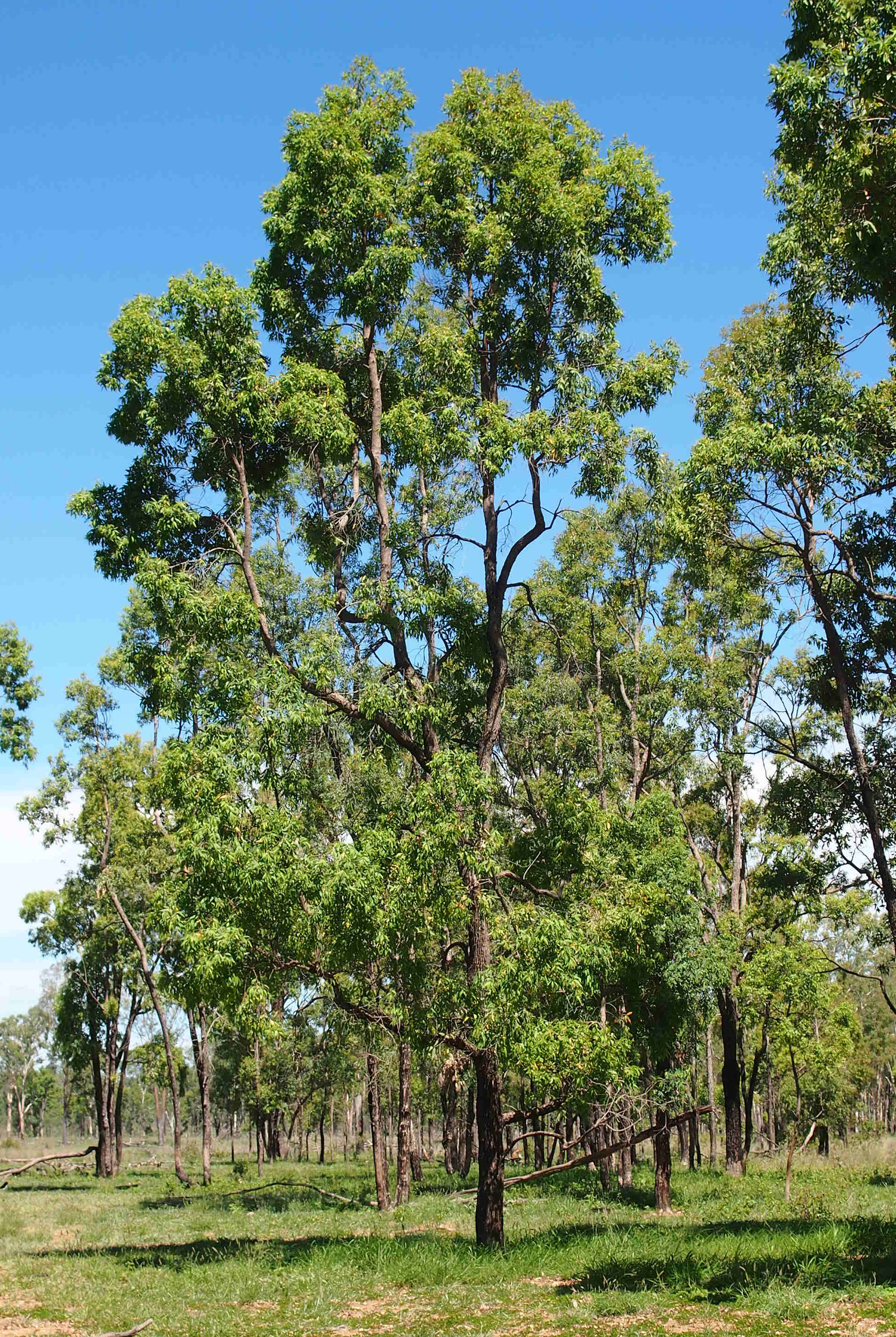

Conservation status
- Near Threatened (IUCN 3.1)

Scientific classification
- Kingdom: Plantae
- Clade: Tracheophytes
- Clade: Angiosperms
- Clade: Eudicots
- Clade: Rosids
- Order: Myrtales
- Family: Myrtaceae
- Genus: Angophora
- Species: A. floribunda

Binomial name
- Angophora floribunda (Sm.) Sweet

Synonyms
- synonyms: Acmena elliptica Don ex Steud. nom. inval., nom. nud.; Acmena floribunda (Sm.) DC.; Acmena floribunda (Sm.) DC. var. floribunda; Angophora floribunda (Sm.) Domin nom. illeg., nom. superfl.; Angophora floribunda (Sm.) Sweet var. floribunda; Angophora intermedia DC.; Angophora intermedia DC. var. intermedia; Angophora ochrophylla R.T.Baker; Eucalyptus florida Brooker; Metrosideros floribunda Sm.

= Angophora floribunda =

Rough-barked apple

Species of tree

Angophora floribunda, commonly known as the rough-barked apple, is a common woodland and forest tree of the family Myrtaceae native to Eastern Australia. Reaching 30 m (100 ft) high, it is a large tree with fibrous bark and cream-white flowers that appear in summer. It grows on alluvial soils on floodplains and along watercourses.

== Description ==
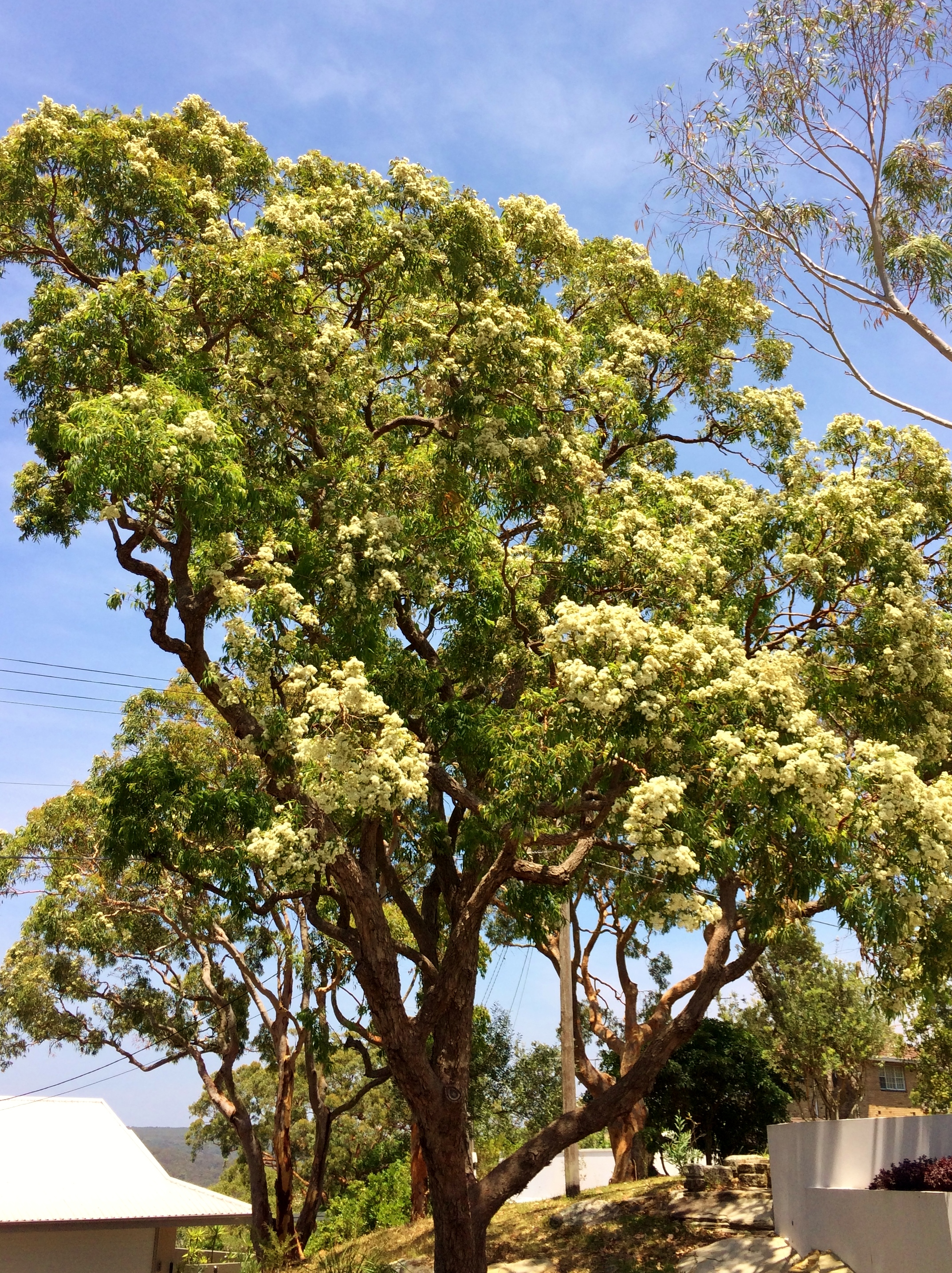
Angophora floribunda in flower, Port Hacking, December

Angophora floribunda is a large, wide, spreading tree growing to a height of 30 m (100 ft). The trunk is often gnarled and crooked with fibrous grey bark. Like all members of the genus Angophora, the dull to glossy green leaves are arranged oppositely along the stem. 5.5 to 15 cm (2.2–6 in) long and 1–5 cm (0.4–2 in) wide. They are lanceolate to ovate and attached to the stems by 0.6–1.5 cm (0.2–0.6 in) long petioles. The leaves in the western parts of the range are narrower than those in more coastal regions. The cream-white flowers appear from November to March.

It can be confused with A. subvelutina, but the latter has leaves that are heart-shaped at their base and lacking petioles, arise from the stem.

== Taxonomy ==
The rough-barked apple was described by James Edward Smith in 1797 as Metrosideros floribunda, having been collected by Surgeon-General of New South Wales, John White in 1794. It was growing from seed in Empress Josephine's arboretum at Malmaison by 1804, when Étienne Pierre Ventenat catalogued it in his Jardin de la Malmaison. The species name is derived from the Latin floribunda 'abundant flowers'. Robert Sweet gave it its current name in 1830. Common names include rough-barked apple, apple box, rusty gum, gum myrtle and Boondah.

Genetic work has been published showing Angophora to be more closely related to Eucalyptus than Corymbia, and in 2000 botanist Ian Brooker coined the name Eucalyptus florida for this species as Eucalyptus floribunda and E. intermedia had already been used for other eucalypts.

This tree hybridises with the broad-leaved apple (Angophora subvelutina). Genetic analysis suggests the two might be a single species, despite their different morphology. Hybridization is present in some populations where both taxa occur but not others. The Charmhaven apple (Angophora inopina) from the vicinity of Wyee on the Central Coast of New South Wales is closely related and may be a dwarf form of A. floribunda.

== Distribution and habitat ==
The range is across eastern Australia, from Rolleston and Roma in central Queensland though eastern and central New South Wales and into eastern Victoria, where it is found at Mallacoota. It is found on alluvial soils, generally on shale or basalt soils. In open forest, it is associated with such trees as swamp she-oak (Casuarina glauca), white stringybark (Eucalyptus globoidea), blackbutt (E. pilularis), Blakelys red gum (E. blakelyi), forest red gum (E. tereticornis), brittle gum (E. mannifera), forest she-oak (Allocasuarina torulosa), grey gum (E. punctata), and broad-leaved white mahogany (E. umbra). In wetter forest, it grows alongside Sydney blue gum (E. saligna) and in closed forest alongside lillypilly (Syzygium smithii), cheese tree (Glochidion ferdinandi), Australian white birch (Schizomeria ovata) and sandpaper fig (Ficus coronata) and under emergent specimens of bangalay (E. botryoides), grey ironbark (E. paniculata) and turpentine (Syncarpia glomulifera).

== Ecology ==
The rough-barked apple regenerates by regrowing from epicormic buds after bushfire. Trees live for more than a hundred years. The grey-headed flying fox (Pteropus poliocephalus) and little red flying fox (P. scapulatus) eat the flowers, and the white-plumed honeyeater (Ptilotula penicillata) forages among the flowers. The tree is used as a nesting site by the rare regent honeyeater (Anthochaera phrygia). The jewel beetle species Curis caloptera, Stigmodera andersoni, S. terminatis and S. vigilans also visit the flowers, the latter three species being fairly specific in their preference for Angophora floribunda. The longhorn beetle species Paroplites australis and Agrianome spinicollis have been recorded from the rough-barked apple.

Angophora floribunda has been recorded as a host for several mistletoe species: Amyema bifurcata, A. miquelii, A. pendula, Dendrophthoe curvata, D. glabrescens, D. vitellina, Muellerina celastroides and M. eucalyptoides.

Female scarlet myzomelas (Myzomela sanguinolenta) have been observed tearing off bark to use in building their nests.

== Conservation status ==
Angophora floribunda is listed as near-threatened on the IUCN Red List of Threatened Species. Despite its very large and widespread distribution, much of its habitat has been cleared for agriculture with an estimated population decline of 22.6%. It remains a common species and the overall population is presumed to be stable however, in many areas where most vegetation has been cleared it is confined to road verges and as isolated trees in grazing paddocks.

== Gallery ==
Features of the rough-barked apple (Angophora floribunda)
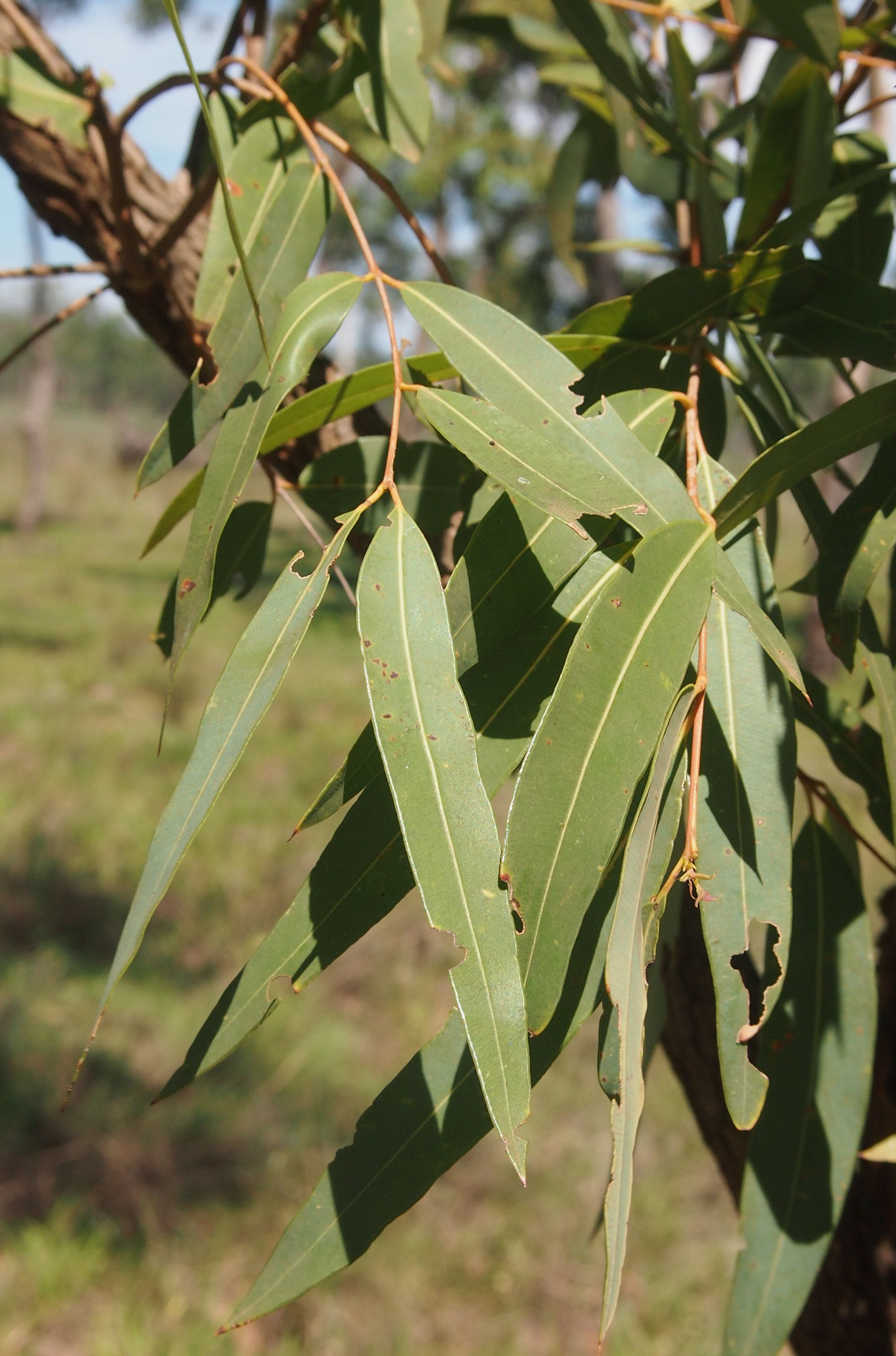
Foliage

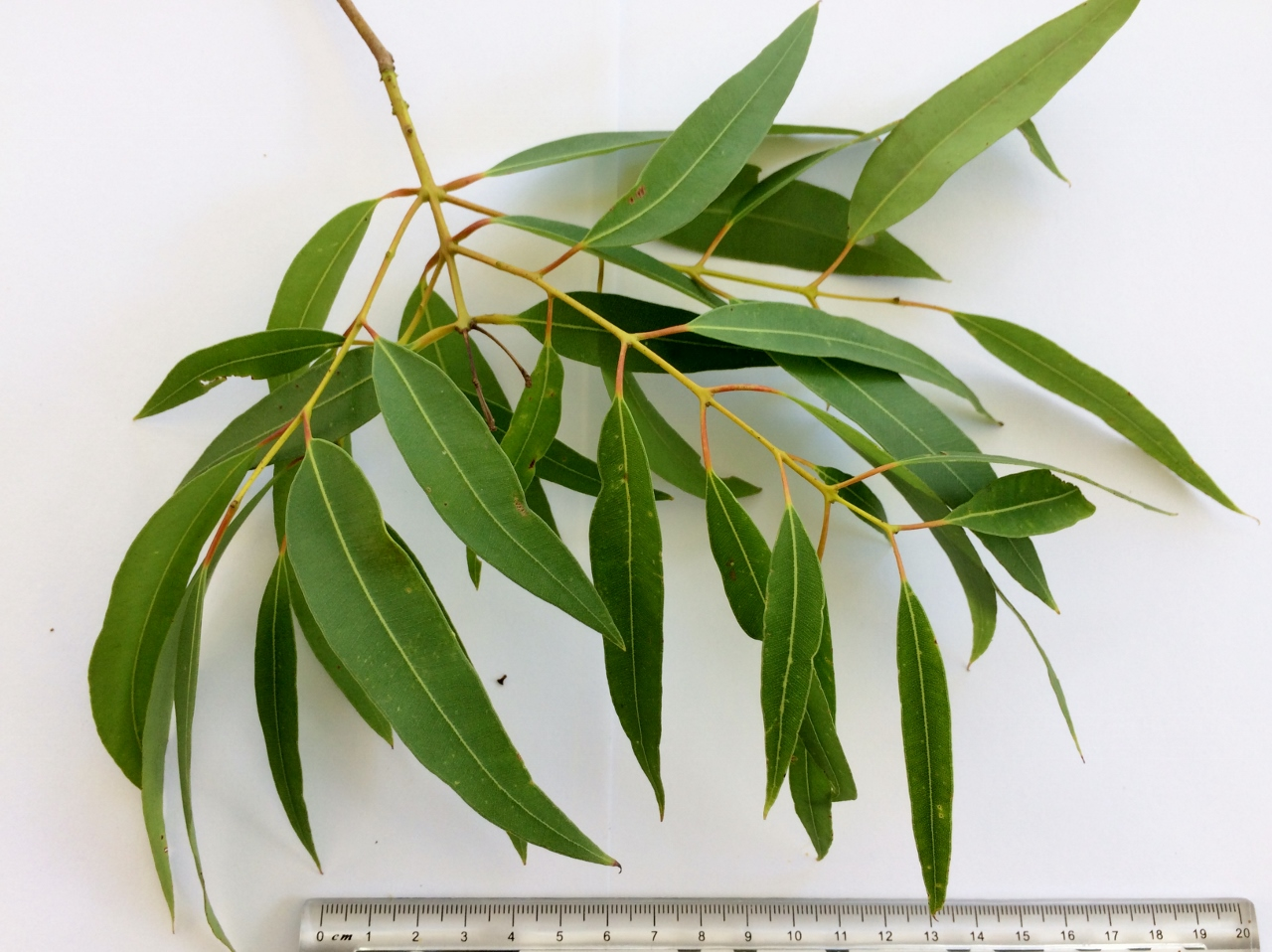
Adult leaves

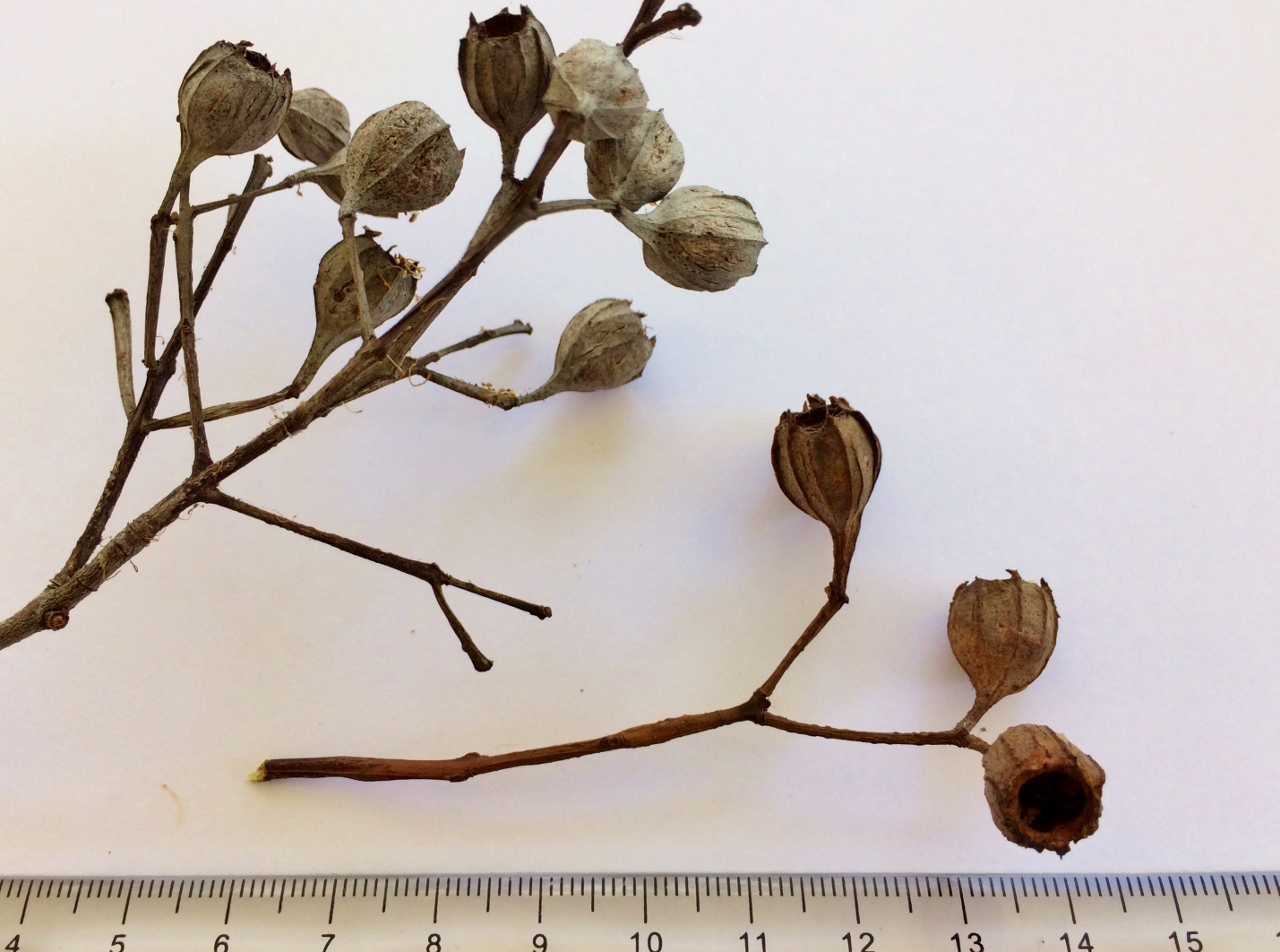
Fruit

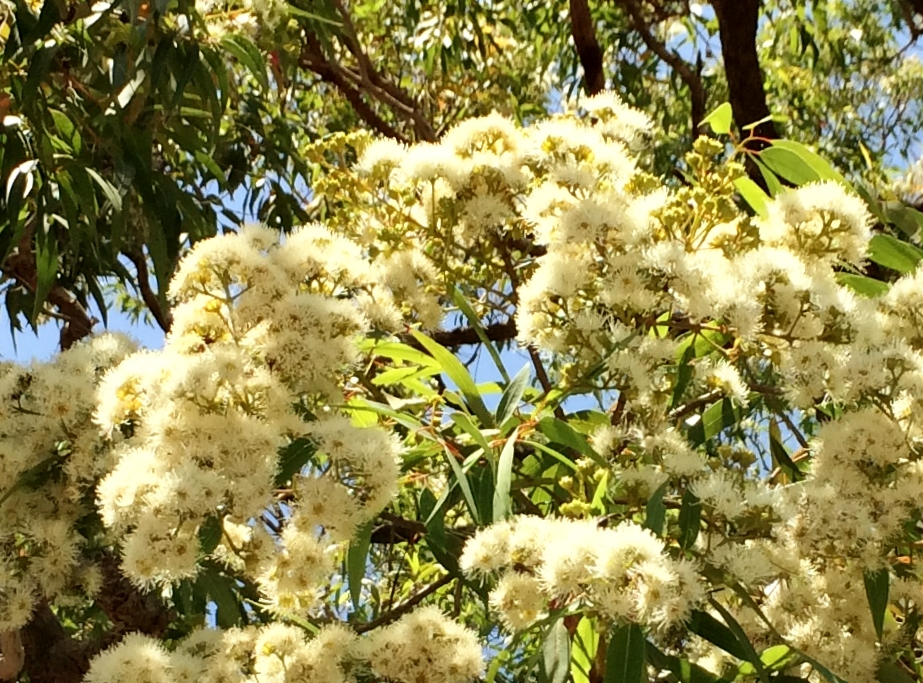
Inflorescence

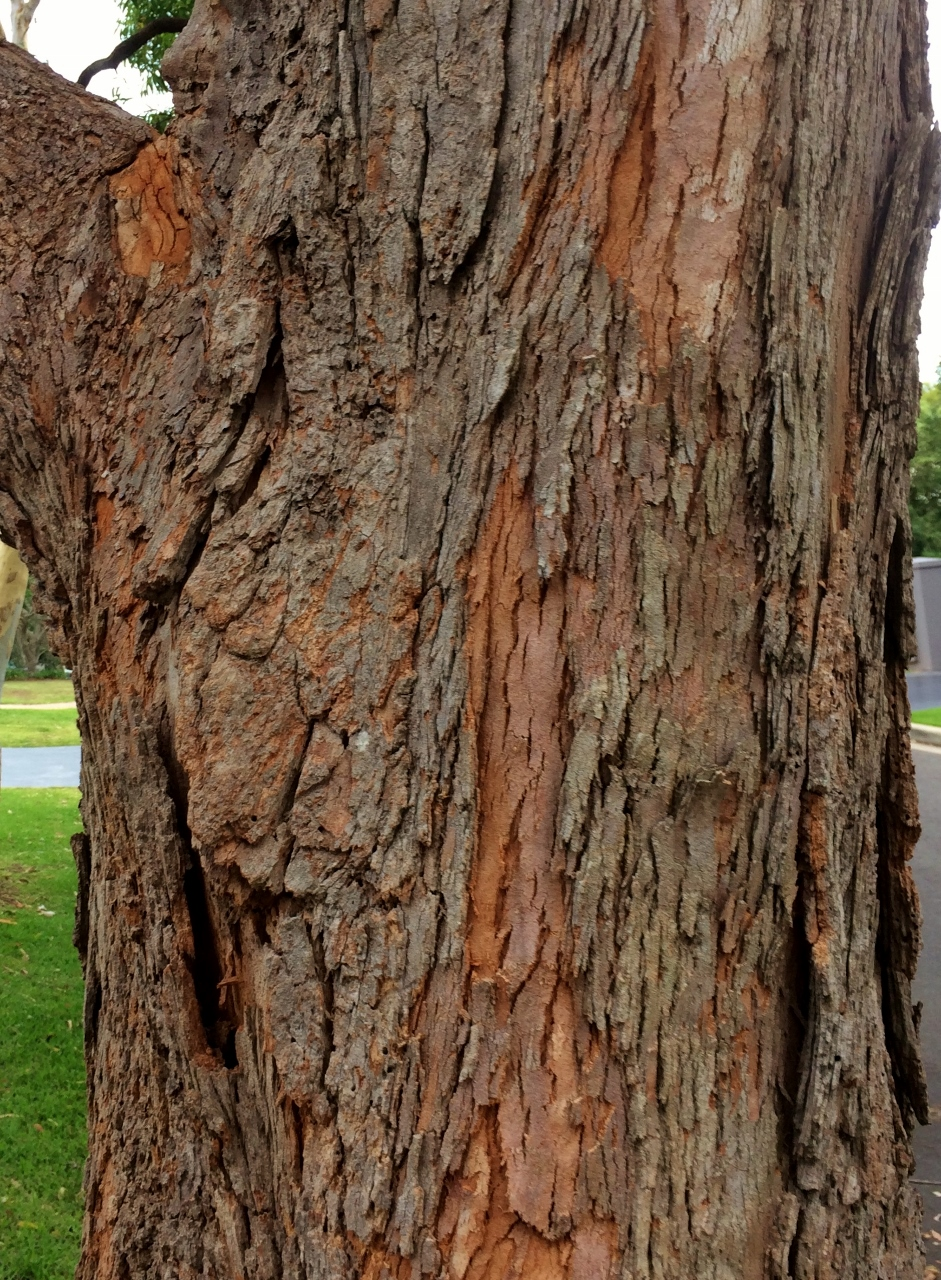
Trunk bark

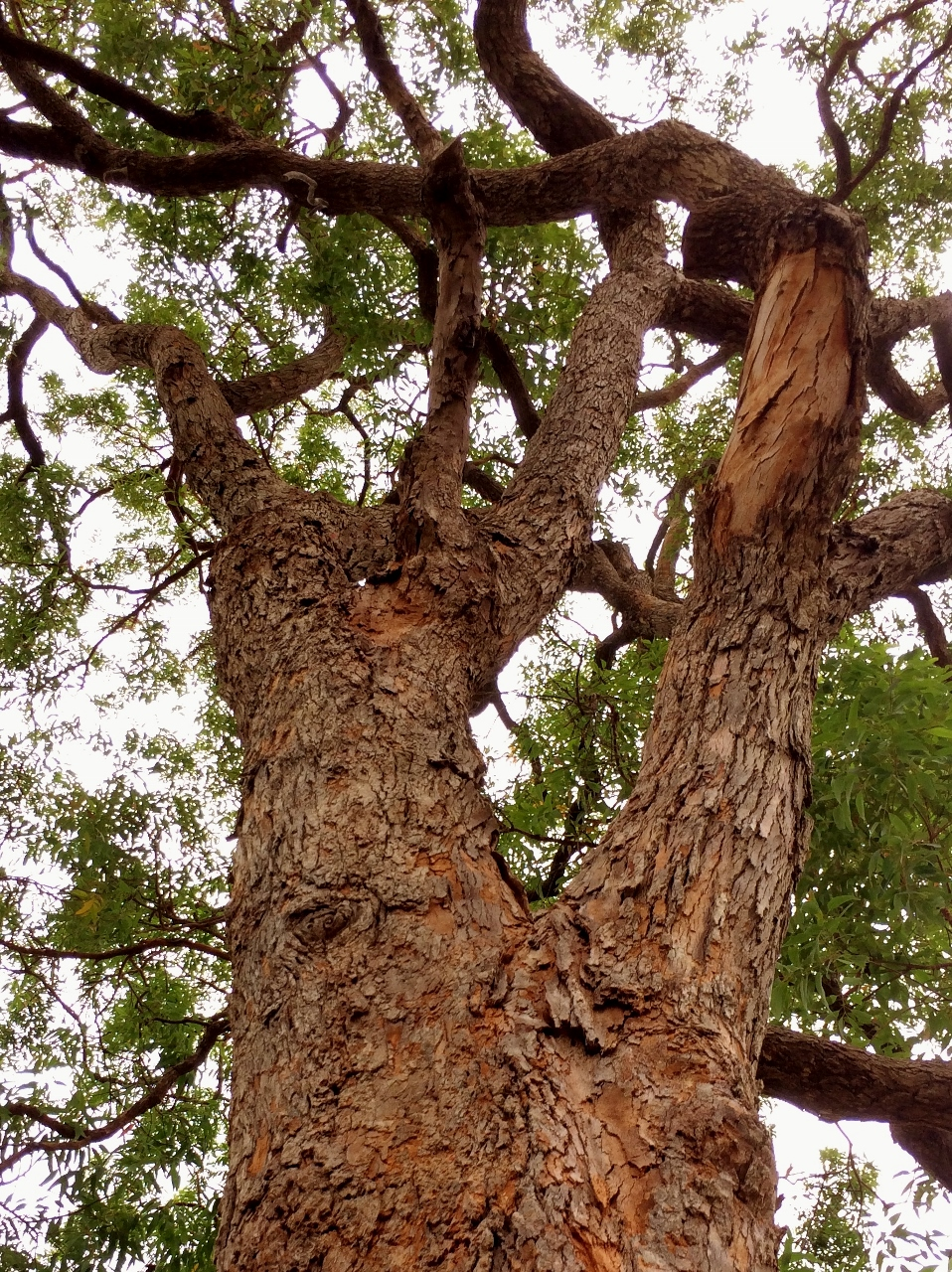
Upper branch bark
