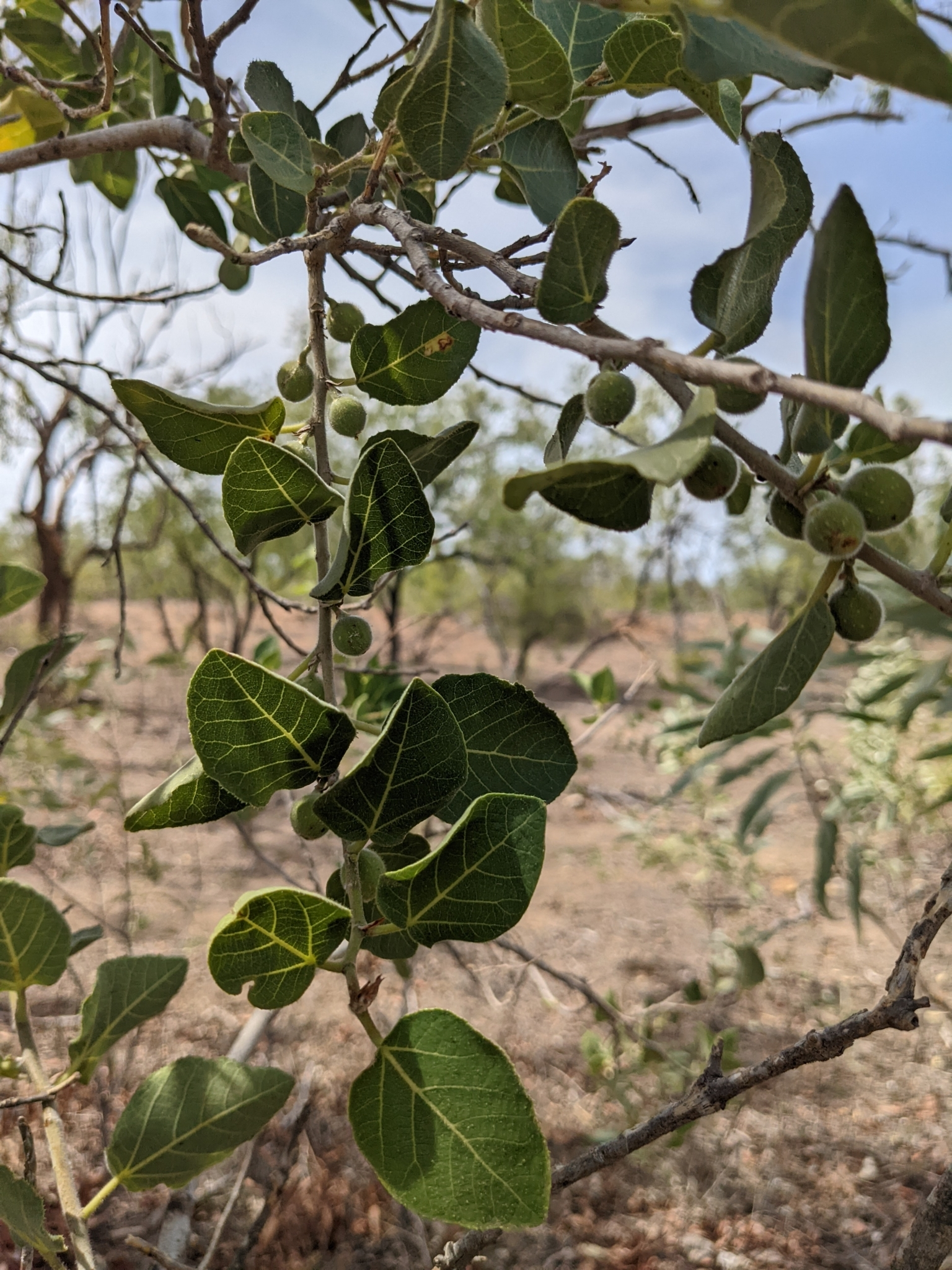
- Ficus aculeata in Roebuck, Western Australia

Conservation status
- Least Concern (IUCN 3.1)

Scientific classification
- Kingdom: Plantae
- Clade: Embryophytes
- Clade: Tracheophytes
- Clade: Angiosperms
- Clade: Eudicots
- Clade: Rosids
- Order: Rosales
- Family: Moraceae
- Genus: Ficus
- Species: F. aculeata

Binomial name
- Ficus aculeata A.Cunn. ex Miq.

Varieties
- Ficus aculeata var. aculeata; Ficus aculeata var. indecora (A.Cunn. ex Miq.) D.J.Dixon

Synonyms
- Ficus opposita var. aculeata (A.Cunn. ex Miq.) R.J.F.Hend.; synonyms of var. aculeata: Ficus aculeata var. micracantha (Miq.) Benth.; Ficus micracantha Miq.; Ficus opposita var. micracantha (Miq.) Corner; synonyms of var. indecora: Ficus beckleri Miq.; Ficus indecora A.Cunn. ex Miq.; Ficus opposita var. indecora (A.Cunn. ex Miq.) Corner; Ficus orbicularis A.Cunn. ex Miq.

= Ficus aculeata =

Genus of flowering plant

Ficus aculeata is a species of fig in the family Moraceae. It is a tree native to New Guinea and northern Australia. It grows in various tropical habitats, including calcareous dunes, vine thickets, creek edges, floodplain margins, gorges, and cliff bases.
