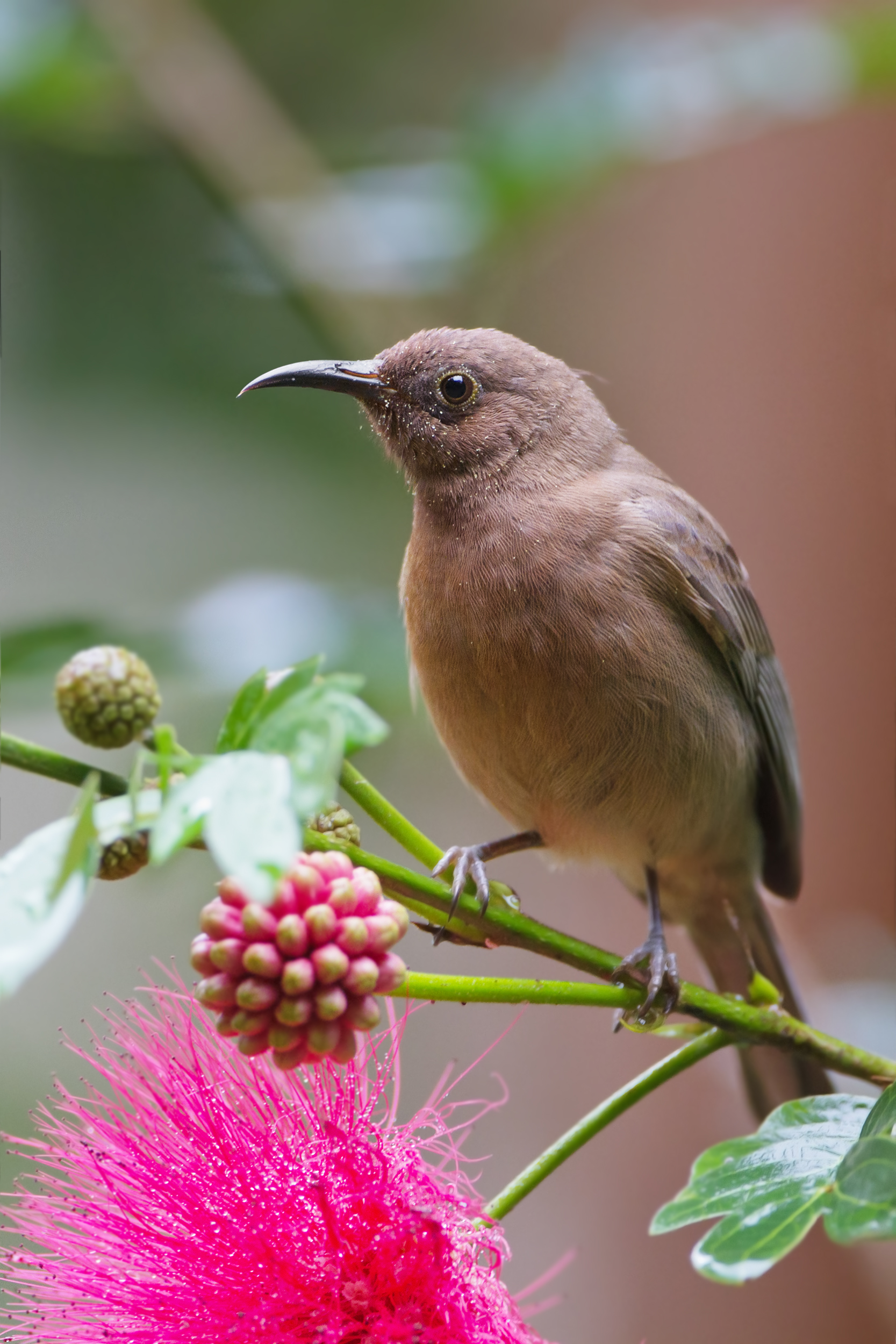

Conservation status
- Least Concern (IUCN 3.1)

Scientific classification
- Domain: Eukaryota
- Kingdom: Animalia
- Phylum: Chordata
- Class: Aves
- Order: Passeriformes
- Family: Meliphagidae
- Genus: Myzomela
- Species: M. obscura

Binomial name
- Myzomela obscura Gould, 1843

= Dusky myzomela =

Species of bird

The dusky myzomela or dusky honeyeater (Myzomela obscura) is a small, brown bird that is a common resident of the Aru Islands, southern New Guinea and northern and eastern Australia, where there are two separated populations, one in the Top End, another from Cape York Peninsula along the east coast as far south as the New South Wales border, though the species is rare south of Rockhampton. The Moluccan myzomela (M. simplex), red-tinged myzomela (M. rubrotincta), and Biak myzomela (M. rubrobrunnea) were formerly considered conspecific, but was split as distinct species by the IOC in 2021.

Around 12 to 15 cm (5 to 6 in) long, dusky myzomelas are dull-coloured but active and fast moving, often hovering to take insects or nectar from flowers in the upper storey. They inhabit a wide range of habitat types, including monsoonal forests and scrubs, woodlands, swamps and almost any area near water.

Dusky myzomelas tend to be sedentary in sufficiently attractive areas, nomadic or migratory in less attractive districts, particularly in the southern part of their range.

Breeding takes place in the dry season (typically March to September). The dusky myzomela normally constructs a small, neat cup nest out of fine bark, spiderwebs, and leaves, on a well-hidden branch high over water. Its eggs are white with fine reddish spots.
