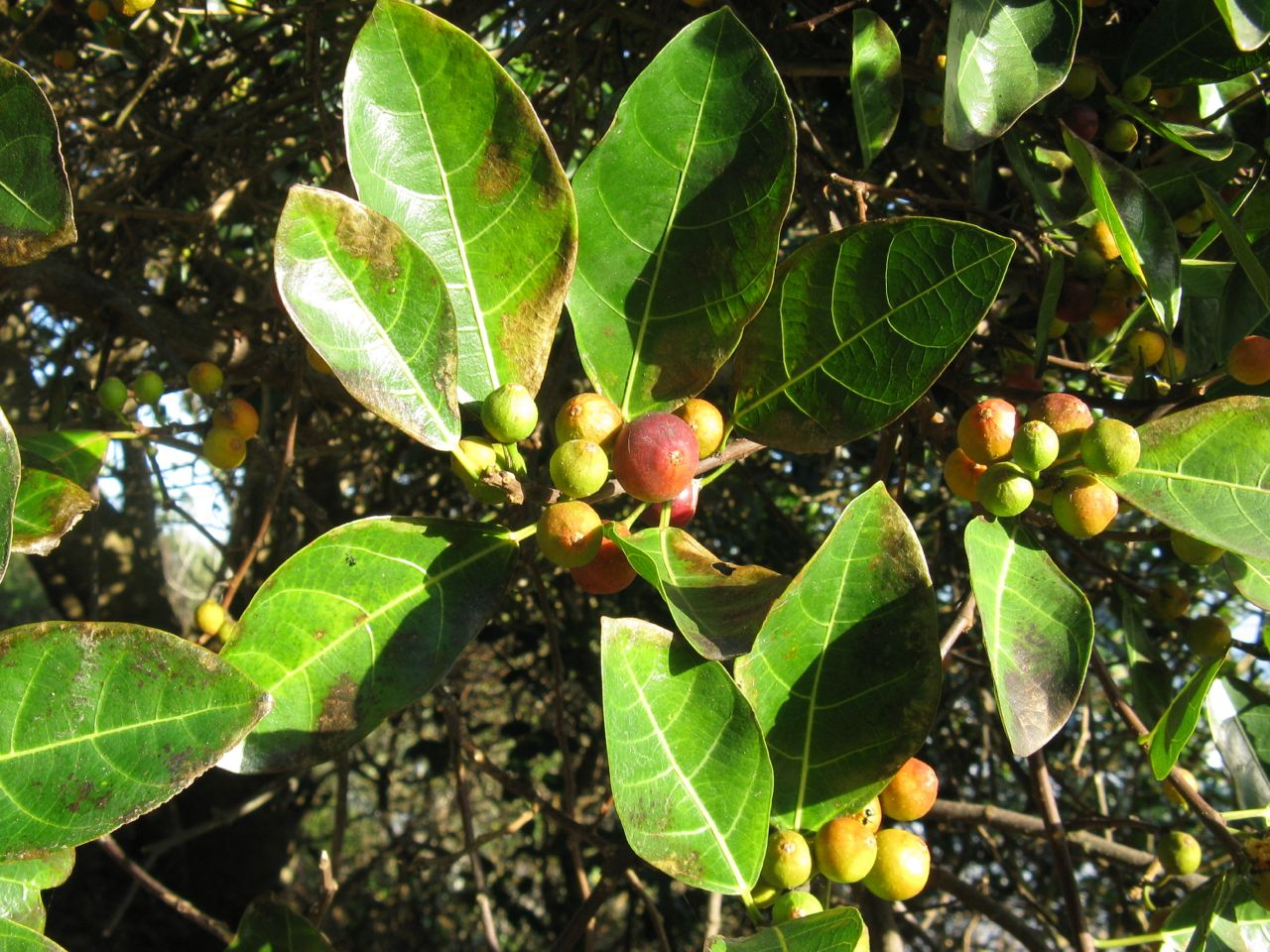

Conservation status
- Least Concern (IUCN 3.1)

Scientific classification
- Kingdom: Plantae
- Clade: Tracheophytes
- Clade: Angiosperms
- Clade: Eudicots
- Clade: Rosids
- Order: Rosales
- Family: Moraceae
- Genus: Ficus
- Subgenus: F. subg. Sycidium
- Species: F. fraseri

Binomial name
- Ficus fraseri Miq.

Synonyms
- Ficus aspera var. abbreviata Miq.; Ficus aspera var. subglabra Benth.; Ficus proteus Bureau; Ficus proteus var. dentata Bureau; Ficus proteus var. lobata Bureau; Ficus stenocarpa F.Muell. ex Benth.; Ficus stephanocarpa var. subglabra (Benth.) Maiden & Betche; Ficus subglabra (Benth.) F.Muell.

= Ficus fraseri =

Species of fig

Ficus fraseri, the white sandpaper fig or shiny sandpaper fig, is one of several fig species commonly known as sandpaper figs. It is native to the northern and eastern coasts of Australia, and to New Caledonia and Vanuatu. Other common names are "figwood" and "watery fig".

It grows as either a shrub or tree with height ranging from around 6 to 15 metres. Its leaves are 6 to 14 cm long and 2.5 to 6.5 cm wide on petioles that are 1 to 2 cm long. The rounded figs are 1 to 1.5 cm long and start out yellow in colour, maturing to orange-red between May and February in the species' native range. They are edible, but insipid.

In Australia, the species occurs from Tuggerah Lake in New South Wales, northwards to the Atherton Tableland in Queensland, and rarely in the Northern Territory.

The grey-headed flying fox feeds on the figs.

Although rarely seen in cultivation, it is a fast-growing, ornamental species that can be easily propagated from seed.

== Distribution ==
Chew states that F. fraseri is found in the Northern Territory, a statement repeated by Govaerts et al. However, Harden (1990) gives New South Wales and Queensland as the only Australian states where it is found, and the collection locations are restricted to these two states for specimens recorded in the Australasian Virtual Herbarium and the Global Biodiversity Information Facility (in addition to New Caledonia in the latter case), as shown on their distribution maps.

== Taxonomy ==
It was first described by Miquel in 1848.
