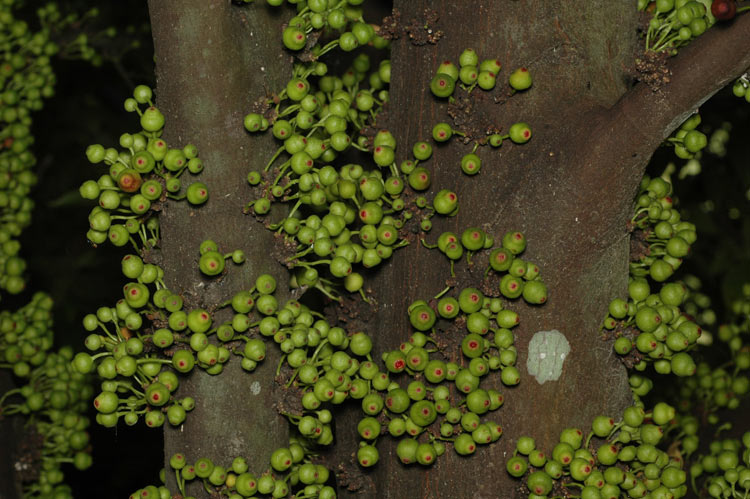

Conservation status
- Least Concern (IUCN 3.1)

Scientific classification
- Kingdom: Plantae
- Clade: Tracheophytes
- Clade: Angiosperms
- Clade: Eudicots
- Clade: Rosids
- Order: Rosales
- Family: Moraceae
- Genus: Ficus
- Species: F. leptoclada

Binomial name
- Ficus leptoclada Benth.

= Ficus leptoclada =

Species of flowering plant

Ficus leptoclada, commonly known as Atherton fig or figwood, is a species of plant in the family Moraceae. It is native to the Wet Tropics bioregion of Queensland, Australia.

== Description ==
Ficus leptoclada is a small tree growing to about 15 m (49 ft) tall, sometimes developing buttresses. The leaves are up to 14 cm (5.5 in) long and 5 cm (2.0 in) wide, and are attached to the twigs by short petioles. The leaves have 7–10 pairs of lateral veins either side of the midrib, and the leaf margins may have very small prickle-like teeth.

The figs are borne in the leaf axils, on the branches or on the trunk. They are more or less globular, with a 'beak' at the apex. They measure about 2 cm (0.79 in) long and 1.7 cm (0.67 in) wide and when ripe may be yellow, orange, red or purple.

== Distribution and habitat ==
It is native to eastern Queensland in two separate populations. The larger group is from just south of Cooktown to the area around Townsville. A much smaller population occurs near Mackay. It inhabits rainforest on a variety of soils, at elevations from sea level to about 1,200 m (3,900 ft). It is often seen in rainforest regrowth, as it is favoured by disturbance.

== Ecology ==
Fruit of this tree are eaten by many bird species, including fruit pigeons (genus Ptilinopus) and double-eyed fig parrots (Cyclopsitta diophthalma), and by common blossom bats (Syconycteris australis).

== Taxonomy ==
The species was described by English botanist George Bentham in 1873, based on material collected in Rockingham Bay by John Dallachy.

== Conservation ==
As of February 2026, this species has been assessed to be of least concern by the International Union for Conservation of Nature (IUCN) and by the Queensland Government under its Nature Conservation Act.

== Gallery ==
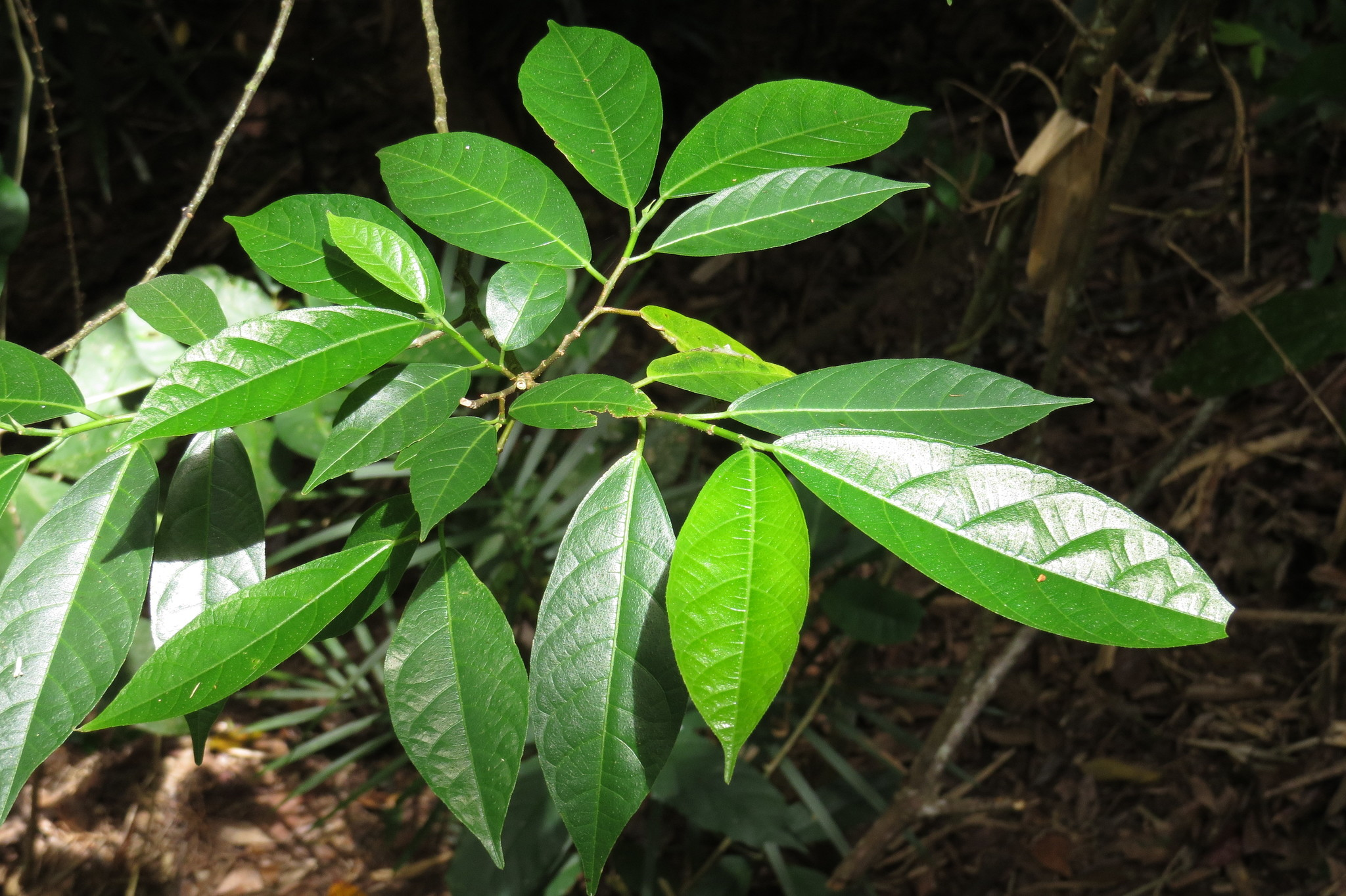
Foliage

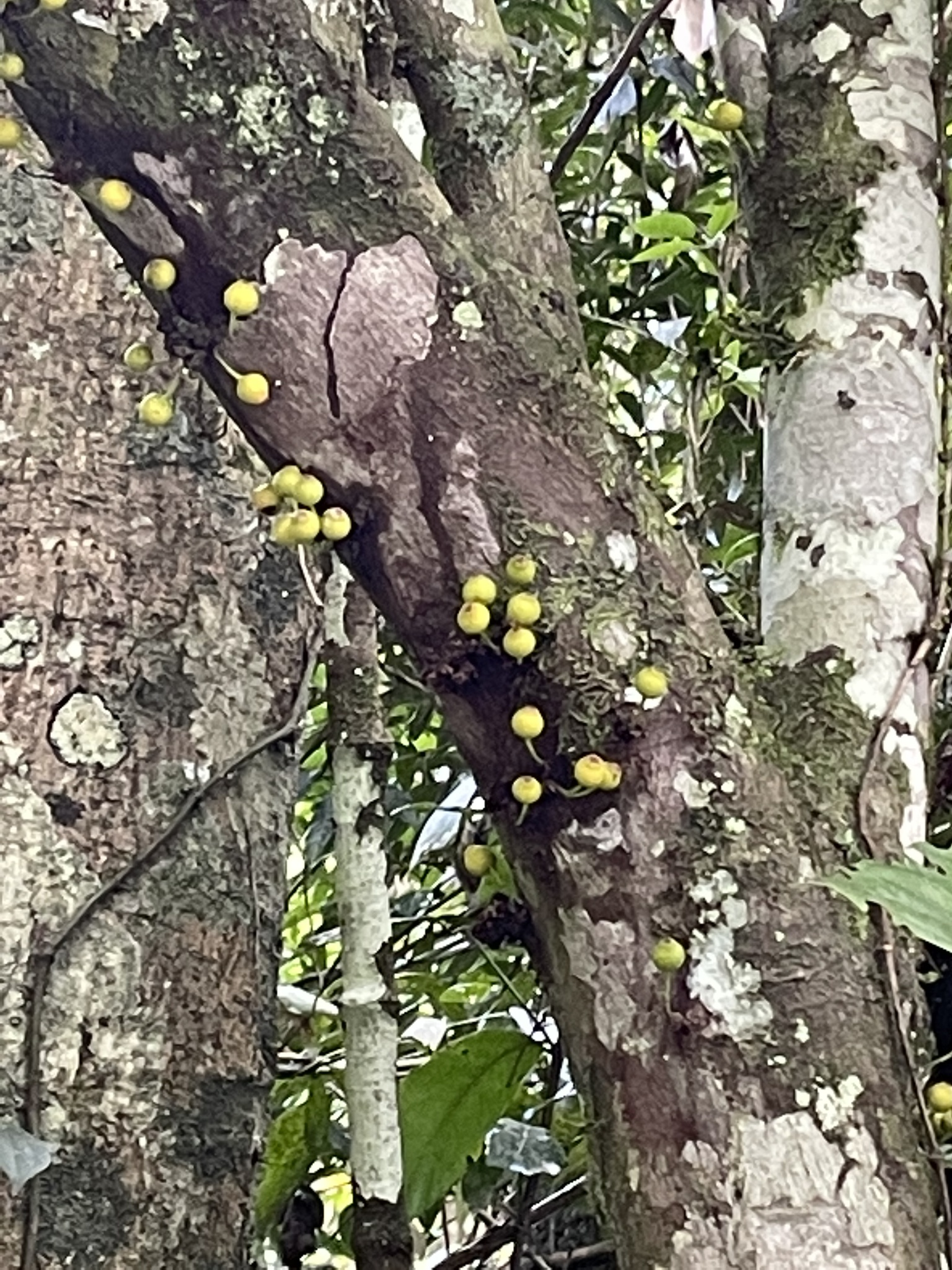
Trunk with figs

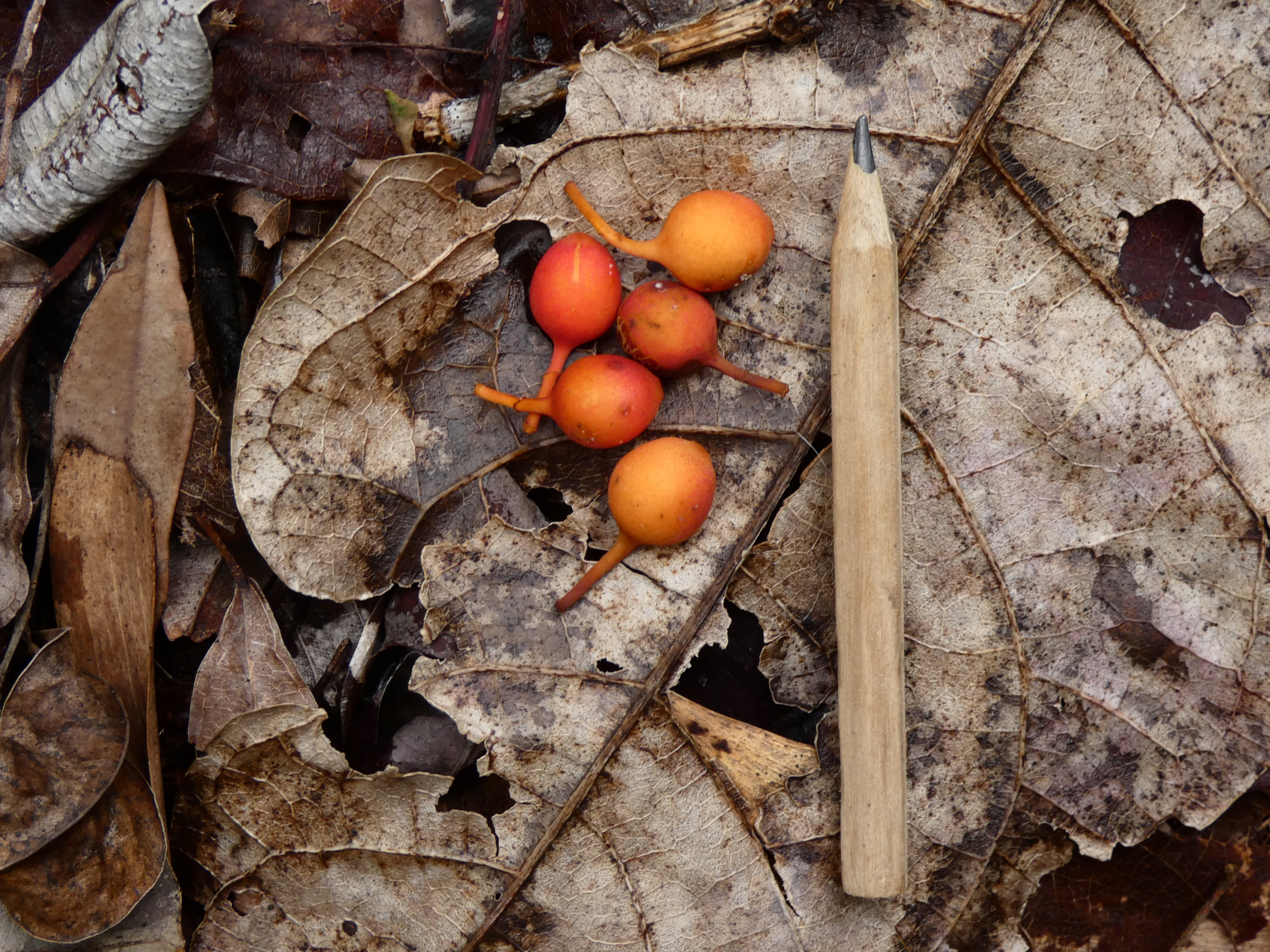
Fruit

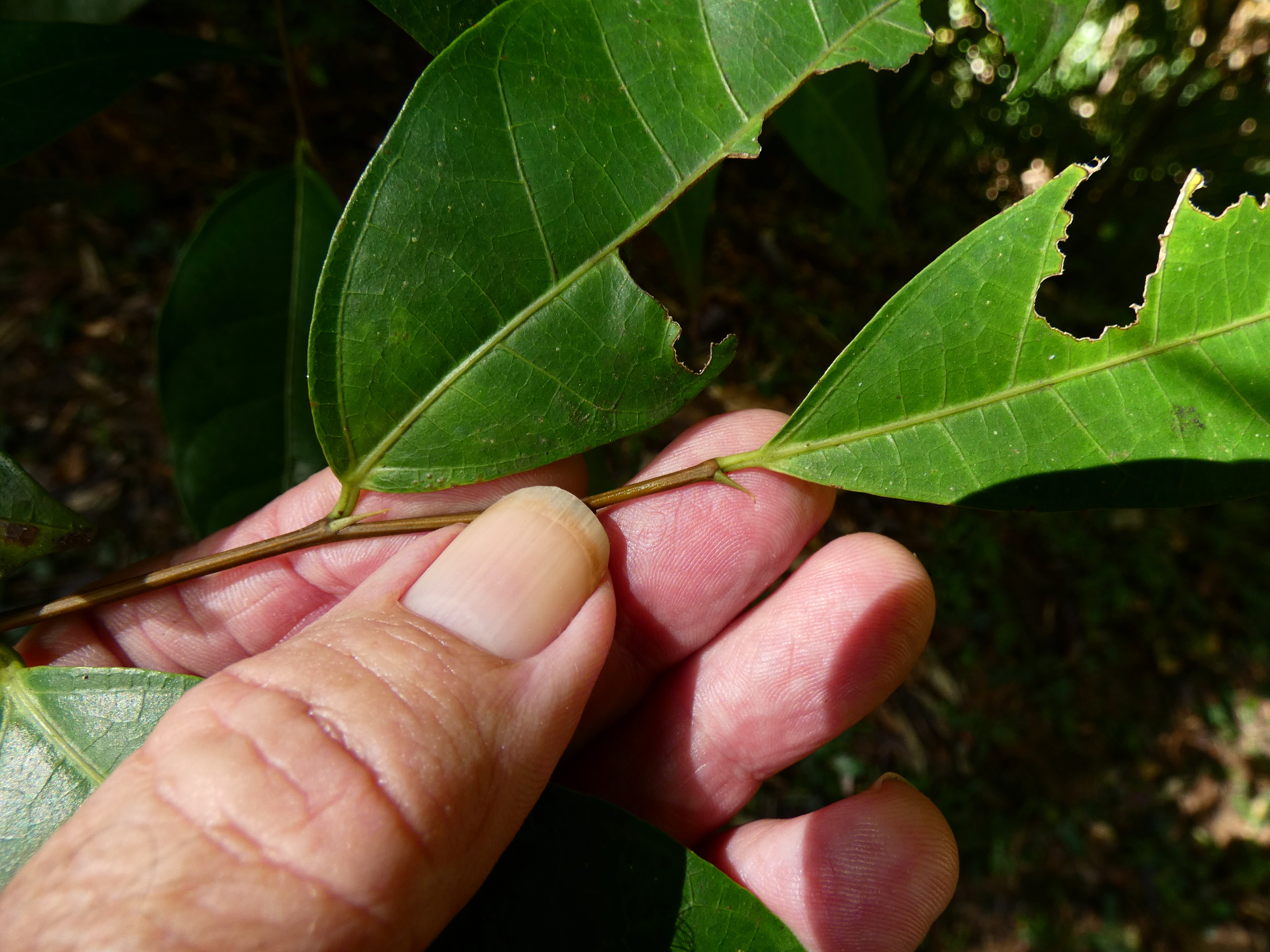
Stipules
