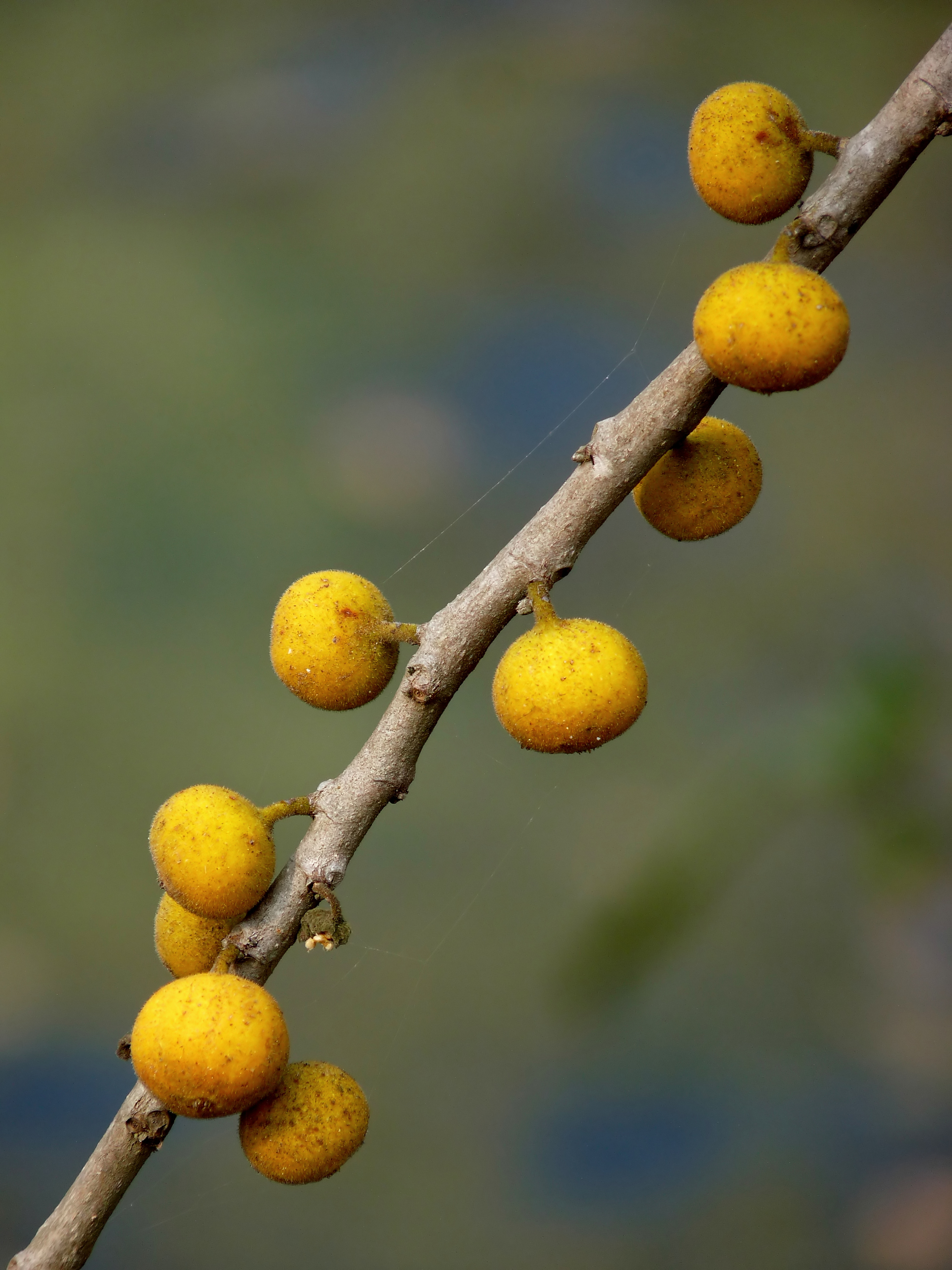

Scientific classification
- Kingdom: Plantae
- Clade: Tracheophytes
- Clade: Angiosperms
- Clade: Eudicots
- Clade: Rosids
- Order: Rosales
- Family: Moraceae
- Genus: Ficus
- Subgenus: F. subg. Urostigma
- Species: F. exasperata

Binomial name
- Ficus exasperata Vahl

Synonyms
- Ficus asperrima Roxb.; Ficus hispidissima Wight ex Miq.; Ficus politoria Moon; Ficus punctifera Warb.; Ficus scabra Willd., nom. illeg. homonym. post.; Ficus serrata Forssk., nom. illeg. homonym. post.; Ficus silicea Sim; Synoecia guillielmi-primi de Vriese

= Ficus exasperata =

Sandpaper tree

Species of flowering plant in the mulberry family

Ficus exasperata, also called the sandpaper tree, forest sandpaper fig, white fig, or sandpaper leaf tree, is a deciduous, and dioecious species of plant in the mulberry family Moraceae, native to tropical Africa (an area from Senegal east to Ethiopia and south to Angola and Mozambique) and southern Asia (India, Sri Lanka, Yemen).

The species was described by Martin Vahl in 1805.

== Description ==
Sandpaper tree is a small to medium-sized tree in the banyan group of figs, growing to 20–30 metres (66–98 ft). The trunk develops aerial and buttressing roots to anchor it in the soil and help support heavy branches. It has almost distichous and alternate which are almost opposite, simple; blade ovate to elliptical or obovate; base acute to obtuse; apex shortly acuminate, acute or obtuse; and margin toothed to entire. Flowers are unisexual and are pink, purplish, or yellow, becomes orange or red at maturity.

== Growth and development ==
Fruit is a syconium and trees may be either female or hermaphrodite. Hermaphrodite trees are functionally male. The tree is known to pollinated by the wasp Kradibia gestroi, where the female lays eggs in female trees with only short-styles. Besides sexual reproduction, the tree may grow with vegetative means propagated by seed and cuttings.
