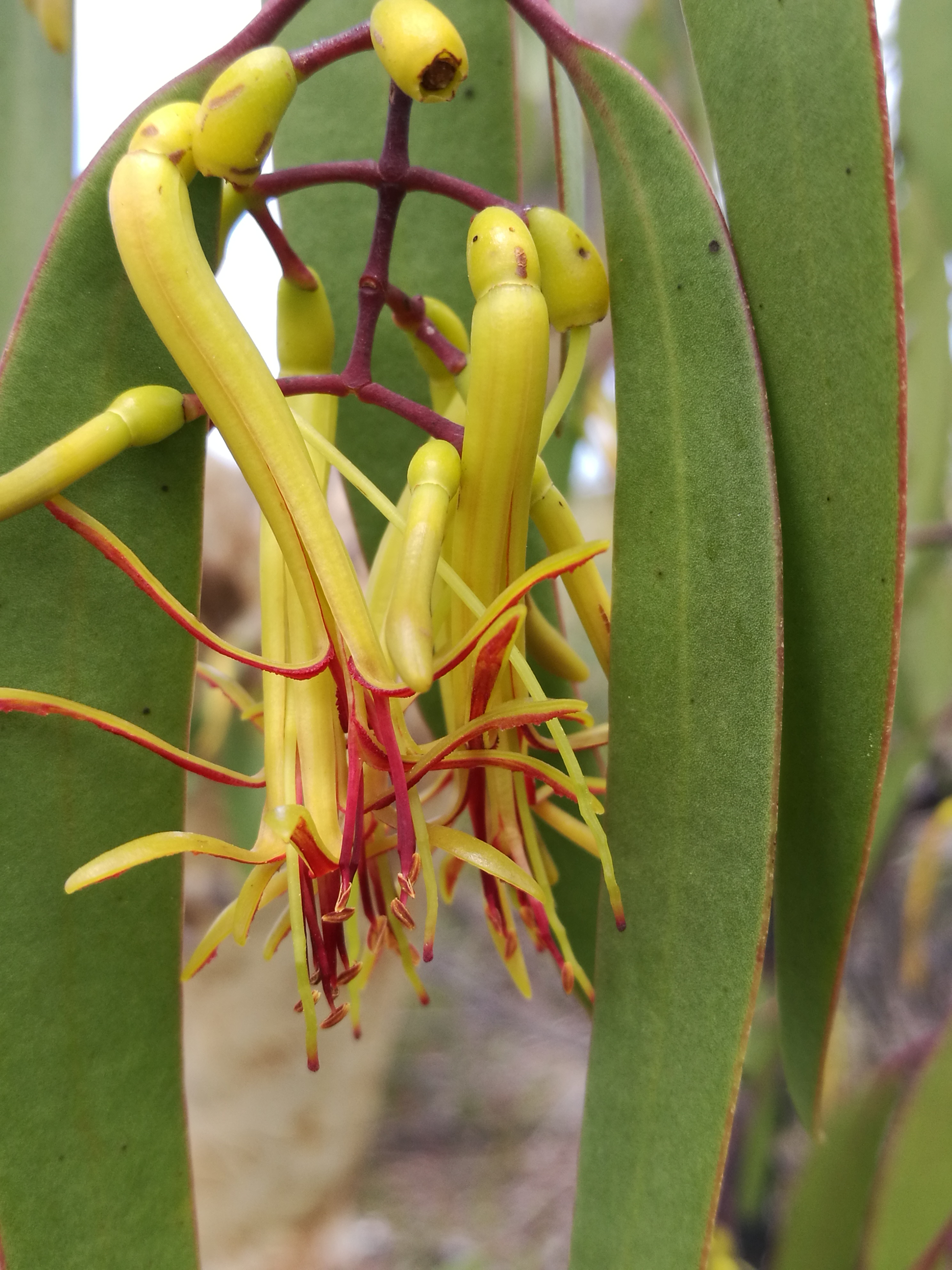
- Muellerina eucalyptoides on Eucalyptus haemastoma, Ku-ring-gai Chase National Park, 27 January 2017

Scientific classification
- Kingdom: Plantae
- Clade: Tracheophytes
- Clade: Angiosperms
- Clade: Eudicots
- Order: Santalales
- Family: Loranthaceae
- Genus: Muellerina
- Species: M. eucalyptoides

Binomial name
- Muellerina eucalyptoides (DC.) Barlow
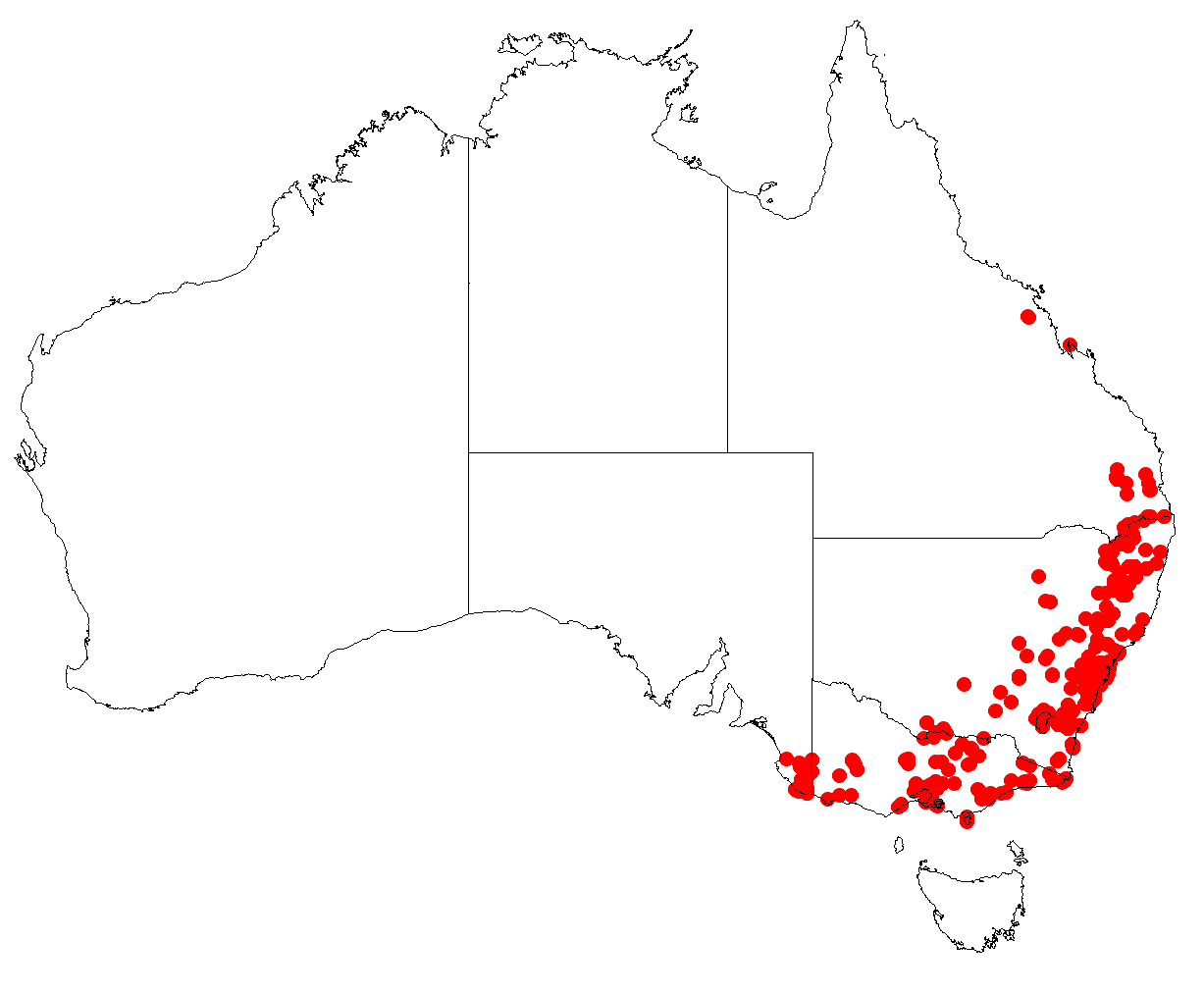
- Occurrence data from AVH

Synonyms
- Loranthus eucalyptoides DC.; Phrygilanthus eucalyptifolius Sieber ex Engl.

= Muellerina eucalyptoides =

Species of plant

Muellerina eucalyptoides, commonly known as creeping mistletoe, is a hemiparasitic aerial shrub in the family Loranthaceae. The species is endemic to Australia.

== Taxonomy ==
Muellerina is a member of Santalales, the mistletoe order, placed within the family Loranthaceae. The name Muellerina was first published by Philippe Édouard Léon Van Tieghem in 1895, where one New Zealand species, Muellerina raoullii, and two Australian species (Muellerina celastroides and M. eucalyptifolia - now M. eucalyptoides) are given. Further Australian Muellerina species are listed in van Tieghem. Another article by van Tieghem further discussing the relationships of Loranthaceae genera is van Tieghem. Muellerina eucalyptoides was first described as Loranthus eucalyptoides by de Candolle in 1830, and revised in 1962 to Muellerina eucalyptoides by Barlow

== Description ==
M. eucalyptoides is pendulous in habit, unlike other Muellerina species, but has the long epicortical runners of all Muellerina species.

The leaves are opposite with indistinct venation. Mainly flowering in summer, the inflorescence is terminal, racemose with usually 3–4 opposite pairs of triads of flowers, with the central flower sessile, and the lateral flowers having pedicels. Corolla curved in bud, free, 5-merous. Stamens are unequal, with anthers dorsifixed and versatile. The fruit is pear-shaped.

== Propagation in Melbourne street trees ==
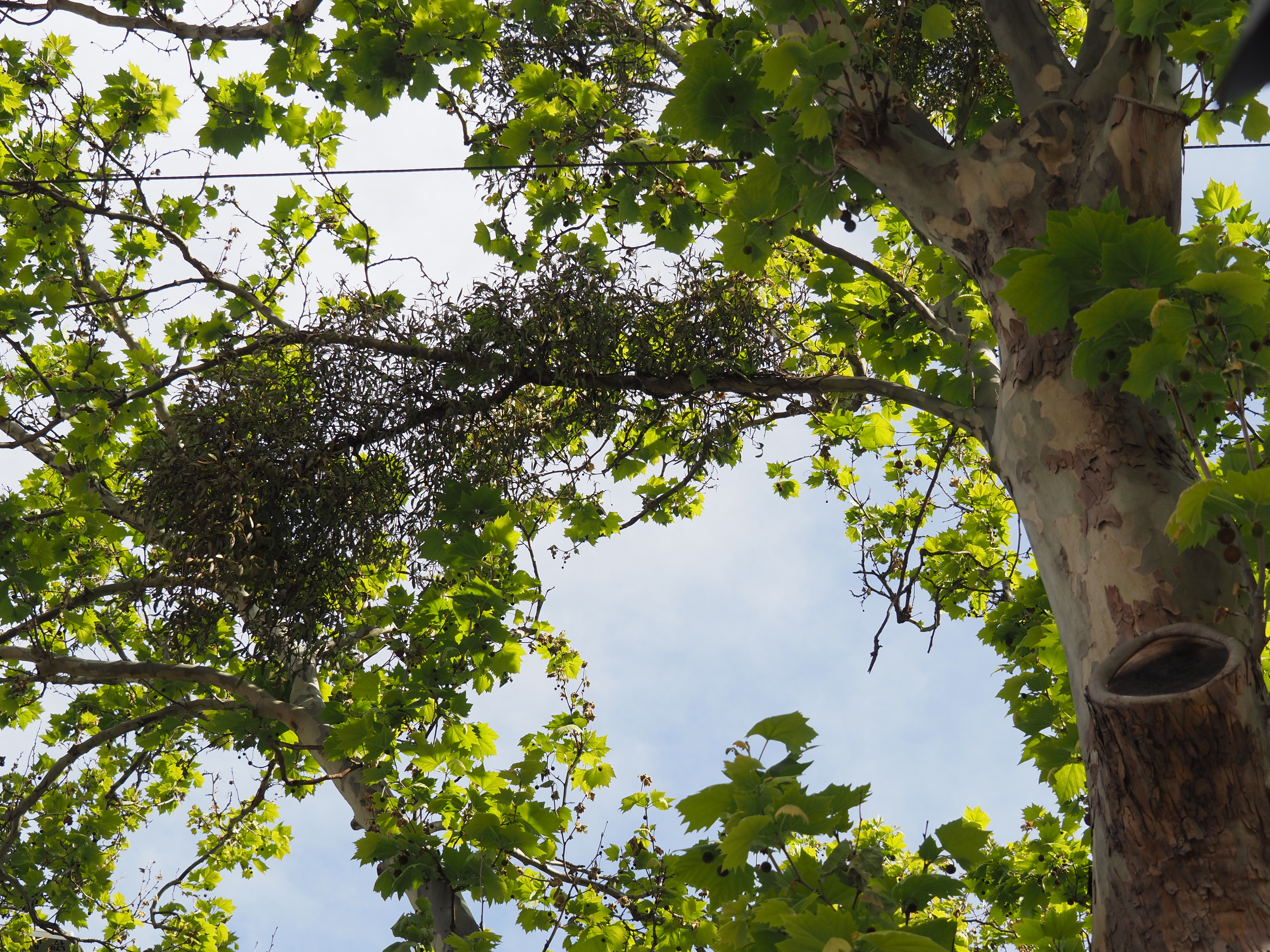
Muellerina eucalyptoides growing on a London plane tree

In 2017, as part of an experimental effort to increase biodiversity in Melbourne street trees, over 800 seeds of M. eucalyptoides were attached to London plane (Platanus × hispanica) trees in the Melbourne urban area. Researchers have stated that:

Many birds prefer to nest in mistletoe because it provides dense shade and cover - which is important in a setting like Melbourne where many of the large urban trees are deciduous.

M. eucalyptoides was chosen for the experiment because it grows on non-native host species, whereas many other Australian mistletoes are host-specific.

A follow-up survey found 24 live seedlings - a success rate of around 3% that is considered good for propagation of mistletoe.

== Image gallery ==
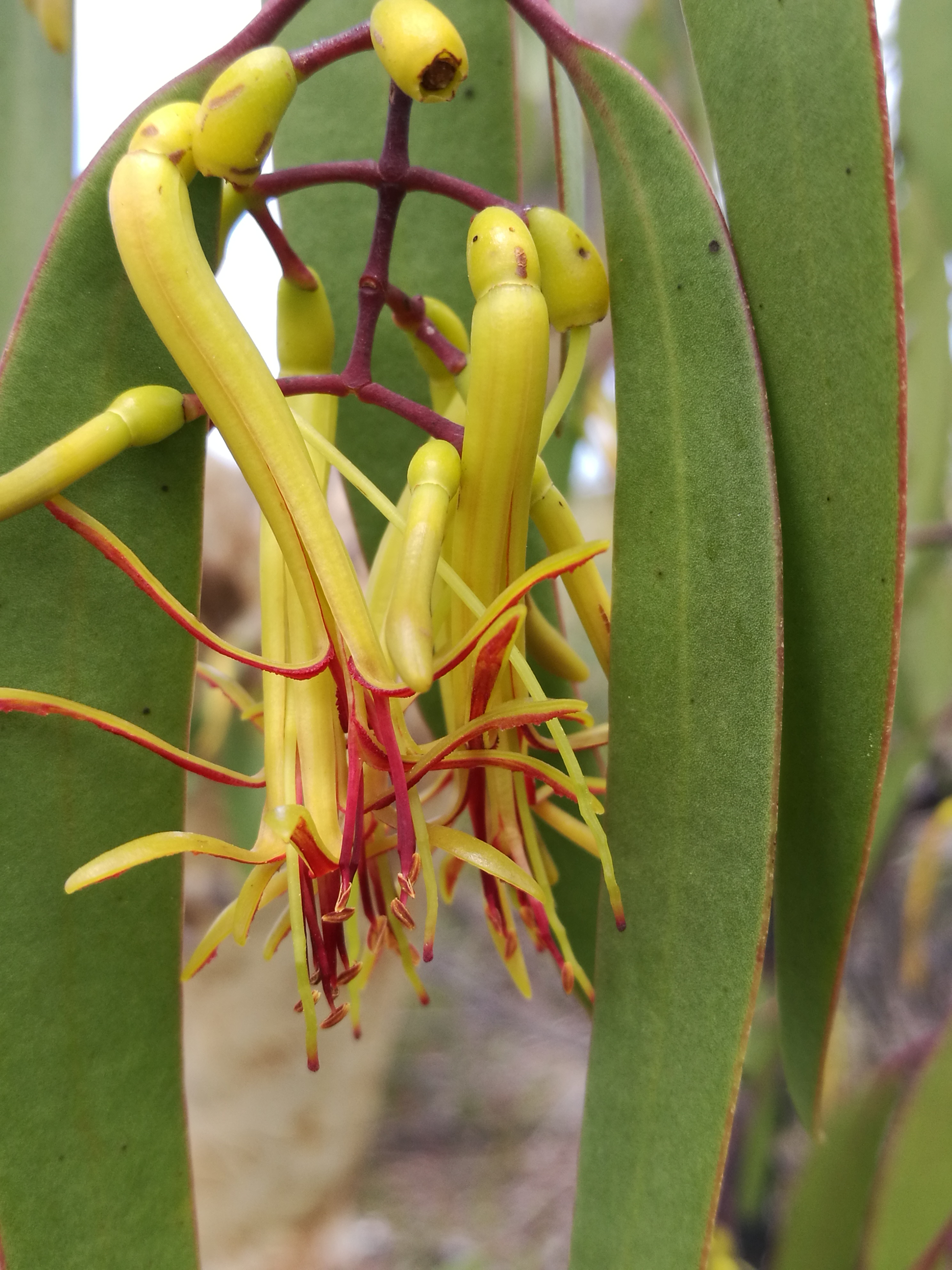
Muellerina eucalyptoides, Ku-ring-gai Chase National Park, NSW, 27 January 2017 (host: Eucalyptus haemastoma)

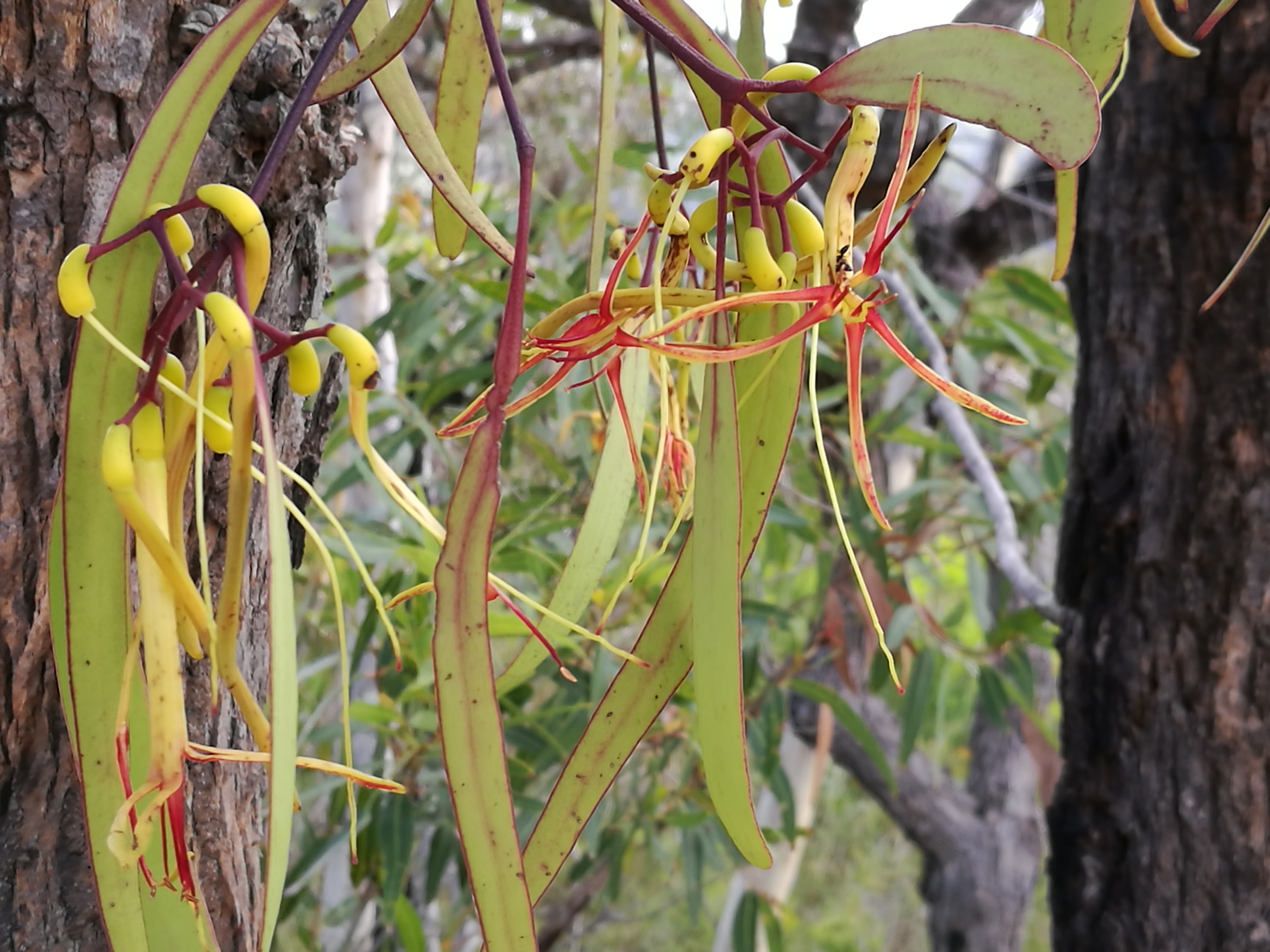
Muellerina eucalyptoides, Ku-ring-gai Chase National Park, NSW, 27 January 2017 (host: Angophora crassifolia)

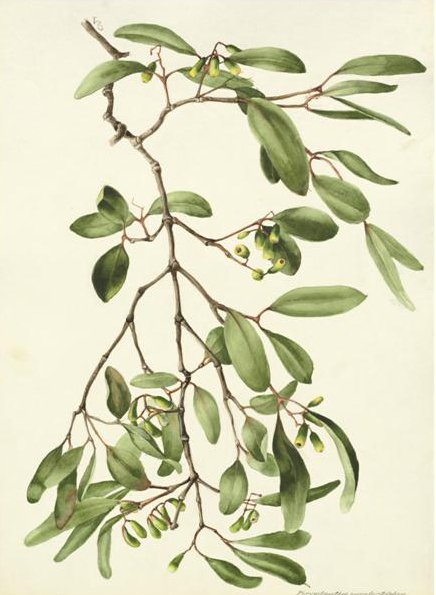
Plate depicting Muellerina eucalyptoides by Adam Forster in A Brilliant Touch (2010) C. Mattingly

== Ecology ==
Muellerina eucalyptoides hosts the butterflies: imperial Jezebel (Delias harpalyce), common Jezebel (Delias nigrina), dark purple azure (Ogyris abrota), Genoveva azure (Ogyris genoveva), golden or Sydney azure (Ogyris ianthis), mistletoe emperor moth (Opodiphthera loranthi) and the mistletoe moth (Comocrus behri).

An inventory of host plants for Muellerina eucalyptoides spp. is given by Downey .

Anacardiaceae Schinus areira *
Apocynaceae Nerium oleander *
Casuarinaceae Allocasuarina littoralis, Allocasuarina torulosa, Allocasuarina verticillata, Casuarina glauca
Celastraceae Euonymus japonicus *
Cupressaceae Callitris endlicheri
Fabaceae Chamaecytisus palmensis *
Fagaceae Quercus humilis *, Quercus robur *
Loranthaceae Lysiana exocarpi, Muellerina celastroides, Muellerina eucalyptoides
Magnoliaceae Magnolia grandiflora*
Meliaceae Melia azedarach
Mimosaceae Acacia adunca, Acacia baileyana, Acacia binervata, Acacia decurrens, Acacia ferominens, Acacia floribunda, Acacia fulva, Acacia implexa, Acacia linifolia, Acacia mearnsii, Acacia melanoxylon, Acacia paradoxa, Acacia prominens
Myrtaceae Angophora bakeri, Angophora costata, Angophora floribunda, Angophora hispida, Angophora subvelutina, Callistemon lanceolatus, Callistemon viminalis, Corymbia calophylla, Corymbia ficifolia, Corymbia maculata, Eucalyptus acmenoides, Eucalyptus agglomerata, Eucalyptus amplifolia, Eucalyptus andrewsii, Eucalyptus bancroftii, Eucalyptus baueriana, Eucalyptus baxteri, Eucalyptus blakelyi, Eucalyptus bridgesiana, Eucalyptus camaldulensis, Eucalyptus crebra, Eucalyptus cypellocarpa, Eucalyptus dalrympleana, Eucalyptus dealbata, Eucalyptus dwyeri, Eucalyptus eugenioides, Eucalyptus eximia, Eucalyptus globoidea, Eucalyptus goniocalyx, Eucalyptus grandis, Eucalyptus gummifera, Eucalyptus haemastoma, Eucalyptus intermedia, Eucalyptus laevopinea, Eucalyptus longifolia, Eucalyptus mannifera, Eucalyptus melanophloia, Eucalyptus melliodora, Eucalyptus moluccana, Eucalyptus muelleriana, Eucalyptus notabilis, Eucalyptus obliqua, Eucalyptus ovata, Eucalyptus paniculata, Eucalyptus parramattensis, Eucalyptus parvula, Eucalyptus pauciflora, Eucalyptus pilularis, Eucalyptus piperita, Eucalyptus polyanthemos, Eucalyptus prava, Eucalyptus propinqua, Eucalyptus punctata, Eucalyptus racemosa, Eucalyptus radiata, Eucalyptus resinifera, Eucalyptus rossii, Eucalyptus saligna, Eucalyptus scoparia, Eucalyptus siderophloia, Eucalyptus sideroxylon, Eucalyptus sieberi, Eucalyptus sparsifolia, Eucalyptus squamosa, Eucalyptus tereticornis, Eucalyptus umbra, Eucalyptus viminalis, Eucalyptus wardii, Eucalyptus willisii, Kunzea ambigua, Kunzea ericoides, Leptospermum trinervium, Leptospermum laevigatum, Leptospermum polygalifolium, Melaleuca ericifolia, Melaleuca linariifolia, Melaleuca styphelioides
Platanaceae Platanus orientalis *
Rosaceae Crataegus monogyna *, Crataegus oxyacantha *, Photinia serrulata *, Prunus armeniaca *, Prunus avium *, Prunus domestica *, Prunus persica *, Pyrus communis *
Santalaceae Exocarpos cupressiformis
Sterculiaceae Brachychiton populneus
Ulmaceae Ulmus procera *
