= Eucalyptus interstans =

Scientific classification
- Kingdom: Plantae
- Clade: Tracheophytes
- Clade: Angiosperms
- Clade: Eudicots
- Clade: Rosids
- Order: Myrtales
- Family: Myrtaceae
- Genus: Eucalyptus
- Species: E. interstans

Binomial name
- Eucalyptus interstans L.A.S.Johnson & K.D.Hill

Synonyms
- Eucalyptus disclusa L.A.S.Johnson & Blaxell

Species of eucalyptus

Eucalyptus interstans is a species of small to medium-sized tree endemic to New South Wales and Queensland. It has smooth white or greyish bark, lance-shaped or curved adult leaves, flower buds in groups of between seven and eleven, white flowers and cup-shaped to hemispherical fruit.

== Description ==
Eucalyptus interstans is a tree that typically grows to a height of 20 m (66 ft) and forms a lignotuber. It has smooth, mottled white and greyish bark that is shed in large plates or flakes. Young plants and coppice regrowth have stems that are more or less square in cross-section and dull green, egg-shaped to broadly lance-shaped leaves 80–120 mm (3.1–4.7 in) long and 30–65 mm (1.2–2.6 in) wide. Adult leaves are the same dull green on both sides, lance-shaped to curved, 80–180 mm (3.1–7.1 in) long and 10–32 mm (0.39–1.26 in) wide on a petiole 17–27 mm (0.67–1.06 in) long. The flower buds are arranged in leaf axils in groups of seven, nine or eleven on an unbranched peduncle 7–16 mm (0.28–0.63 in) long, the individual buds on pedicels 3–7 mm (0.12–0.28 in) long. Mature buds are 11–14 mm (0.43–0.55 in) long and 3–5 mm (0.12–0.20 in) wide with an elongated, conical operculum. Flowering occurs in June and the flowers are white. The fruit is a woody, cup-shaped or hemispherical capsule with the valves extending well beyond the rim of the fruit.

== Taxonomy and naming ==
Eucalyptus interstans was first formally described in 1990 by Lawrie Johnson and Ken Hill from a specimen collected in 1911 at Wilsons Downfall near Stanthorpe by Richard Cambage. The description was published in the journal Telopea. The specific epithet (interstans) is derived from Latin words meaning 'standing between' referring to the intermediate position of this species between E. prava and E. seeana in both its distribution and characteristics.

== Distribution and habitat ==
This eucalypt grows in woodland on shallow, sandy soils, usually on ridges and slopes. It is found on the Blackdown Tableland and southeastern Darling Downs in Queensland and on the Northern Tablelands of New South Wales as far south as Emmaville.

== Conservation status ==
Eucalyptus interstans is listed as "least concern" under the Queensland Government Nature Conservation Act 1992.
