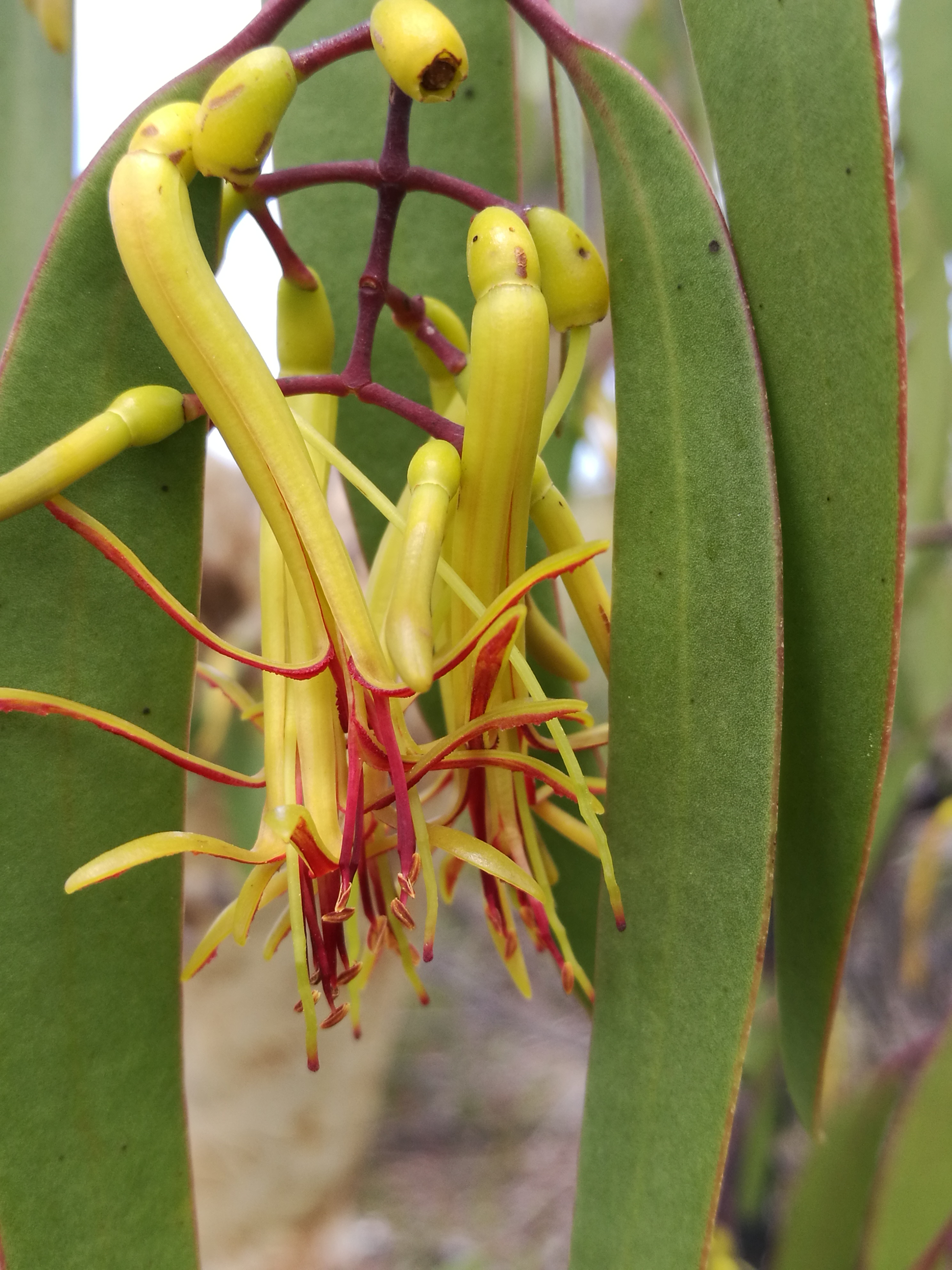
- Muellerina eucalyptoides on Eucalyptus haemastoma, Ku-ring-gai Chase National Park, 27 January 2017

Scientific classification
- Kingdom: Plantae
- Clade: Tracheophytes
- Clade: Angiosperms
- Clade: Eudicots
- Order: Santalales
- Family: Loranthaceae
- Genus: Muellerina; Tiegh.

= Muellerina (plant) =

Genus of mistletoes

Muellerina is a genus of parasitic aerial shrubs in the family Loranthaceae.

This Loranthaceae genus is distinguished from others by having

- Petals free to base or almost so
- Anthers dorsifixed, versatile
- Aerial stem-parasitic shrubs with epicortical runners
- Petals 5, curved; stamens unequal

Species include:

- Muellerina bidwillii (Benth.) Barlow
- Muellerina celastroides (Sieber ex Schult. & Schult.f) Tiegh.
- Muellerina eucalyptoides (DC.) Barlow
- Muellerina flexialabastra Downey & C.A.Wilson
- Muellerina myrtifolia (A.Cunn. ex Benth.) Barlow

== Ecology ==
The larvae of the Australian butterflies Delias harpalyce and Ogyris genoveva feed on Muellerina.

An inventory of host plants for Muellerina spp. is given by Downey

== Taxonomy ==
Muellerina is a member of Santalales, the mistletoe order, and is placed within the family Loranthaceae. The name Muellerina was first published by Philippe Édouard Léon Van Tieghem in 1895, where one New Zealand species, Muellerina raoullii, and two Australian species (Muellerina celastroides and M. eucalyptifolia - now M. eucalyptoides) are given. Further Australian Muellerina species are listed in van Tieghem. A further article by van Tieghem further discussing the relationships of Loranthaceae genera is van Tieghem.

== Image gallery ==
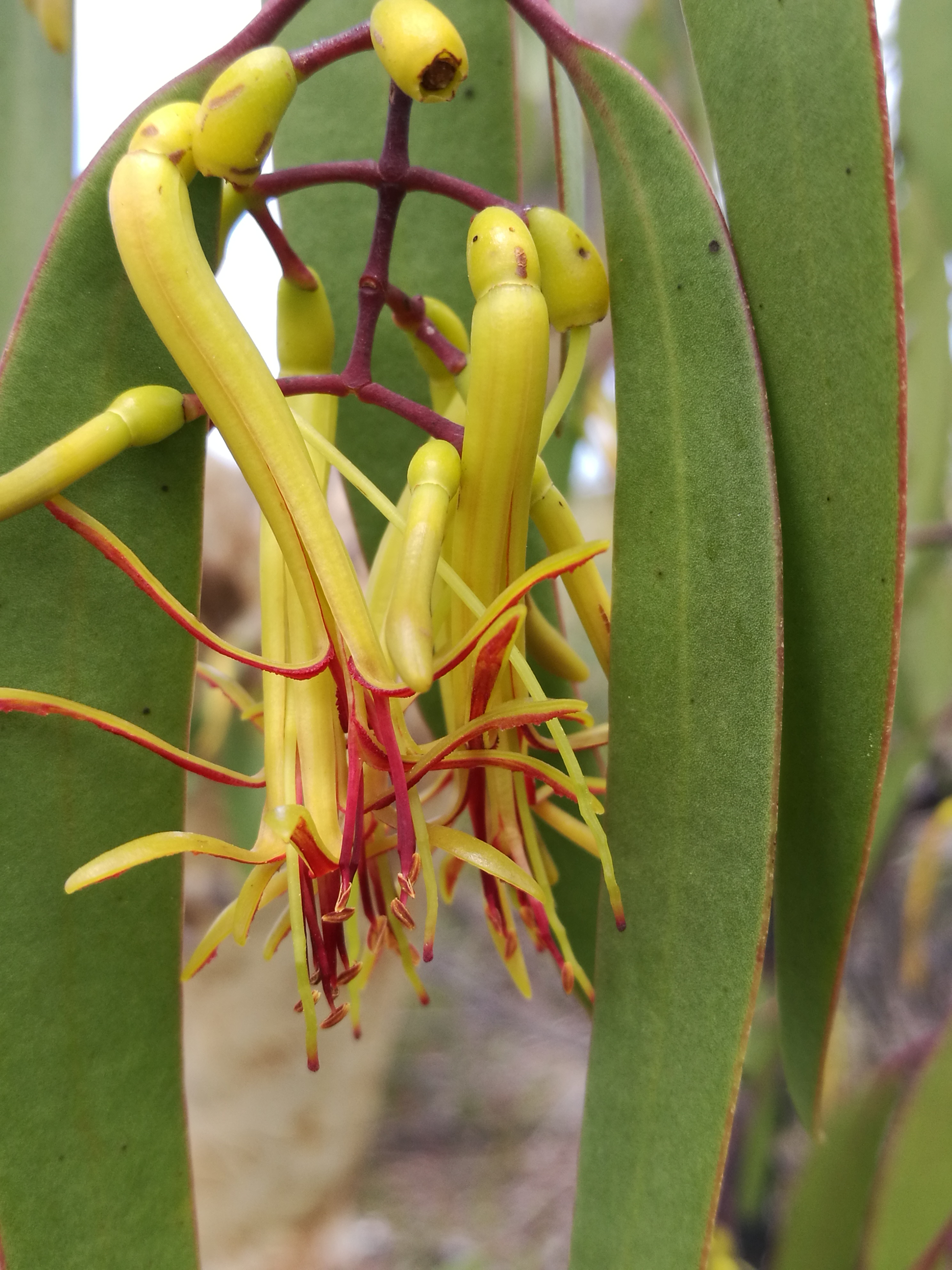
Muellerina eucalyptoides, Ku-ring-gai Chase National Park, NSW, 27 January 2017 (host: Eucalyptus haemastoma)

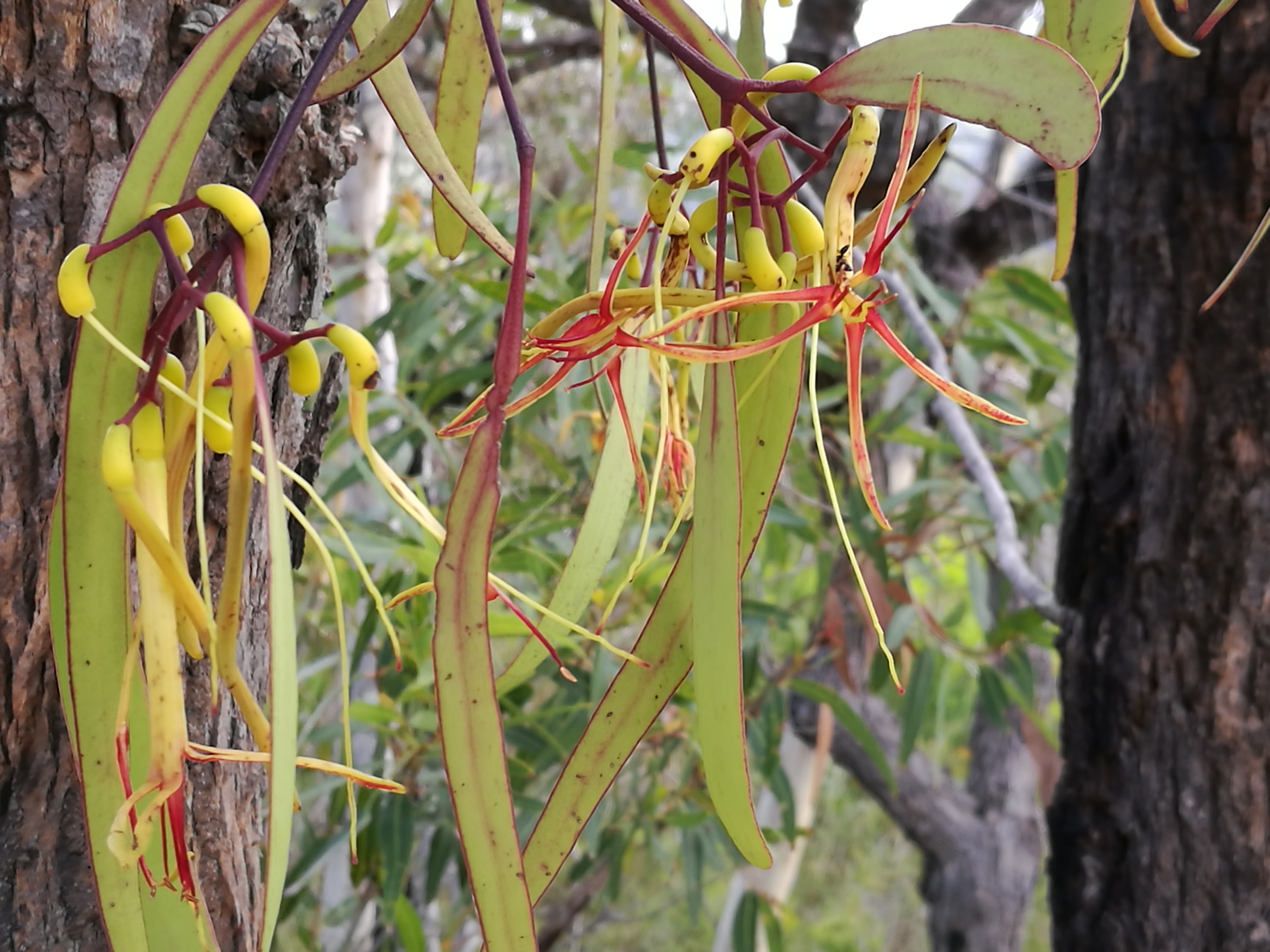
Muellerina eucalyptoides, Ku-ring-gai Chase National Park, NSW, 27 January 2017 (host: Angophora crassifolia)

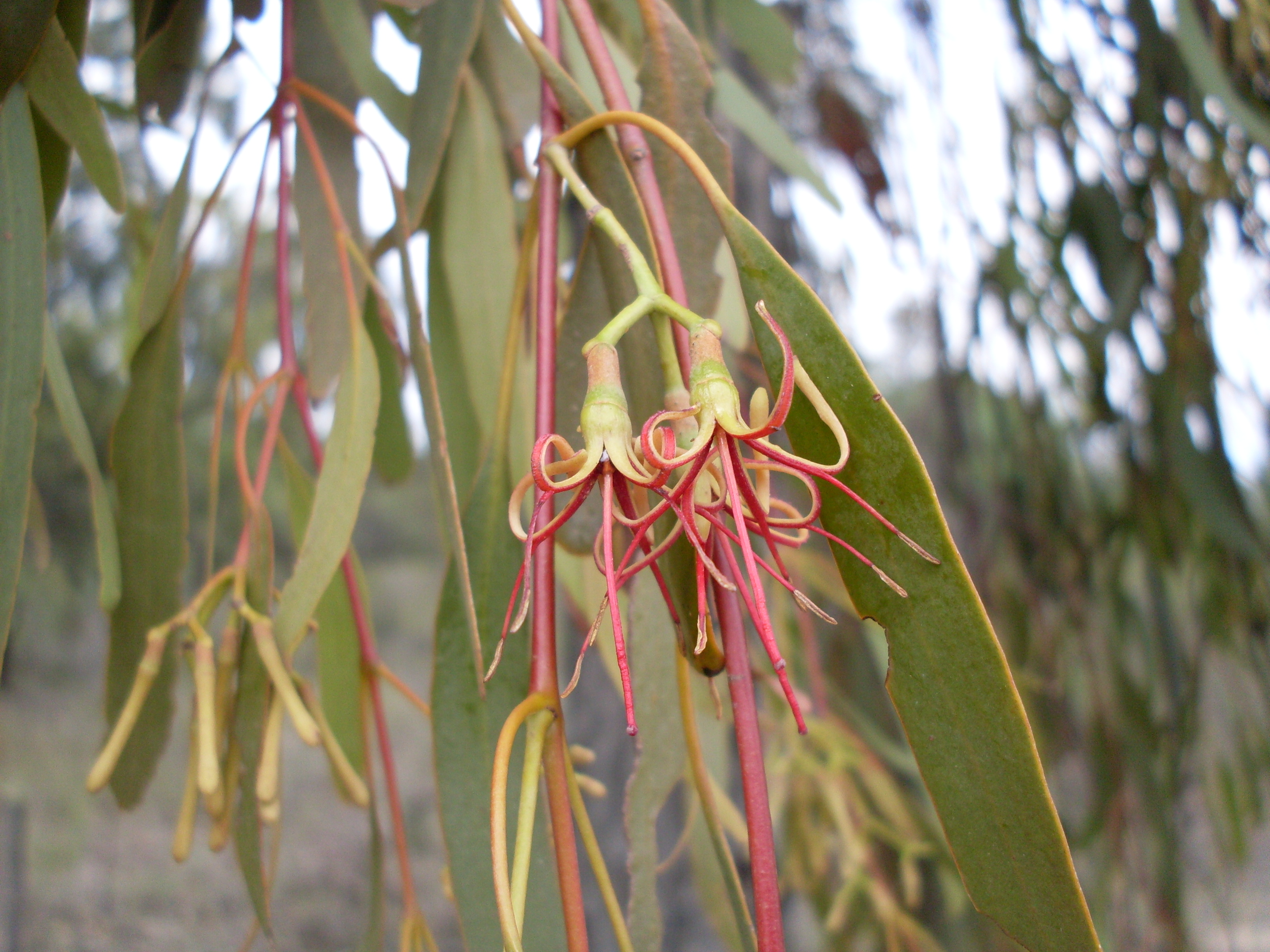
Muellerina eucalyptoides, near Ulan, NSW, 9 January 2009

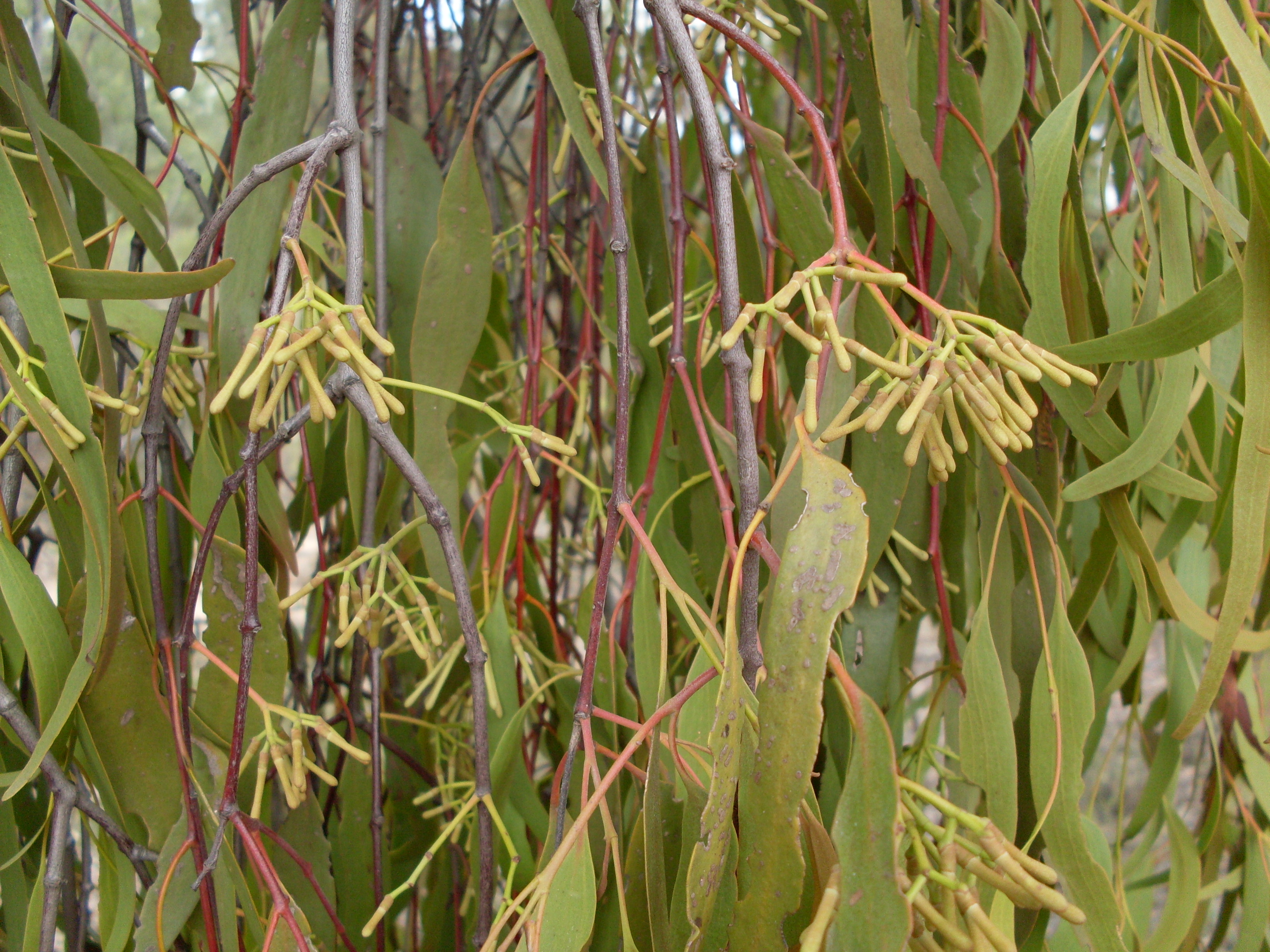
Muellerina eucalyptoides (buds), near Ulan, NSW, 9 January 2009

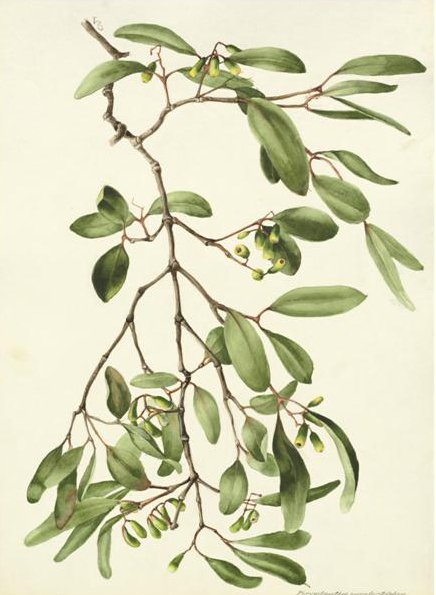
Plate depicting Muellerina eucalyptoides by Adam Forster in A Brilliant Touch (2010) C. Mattingly
