= Muellerina flexialabastra =

Scientific classification
- Kingdom: Plantae
- Clade: Tracheophytes
- Clade: Angiosperms
- Clade: Eudicots
- Order: Santalales
- Family: Loranthaceae
- Genus: Muellerina
- Species: M. flexialabastra

Binomial name
- Muellerina flexialabastra Downey & C.A.Wilson
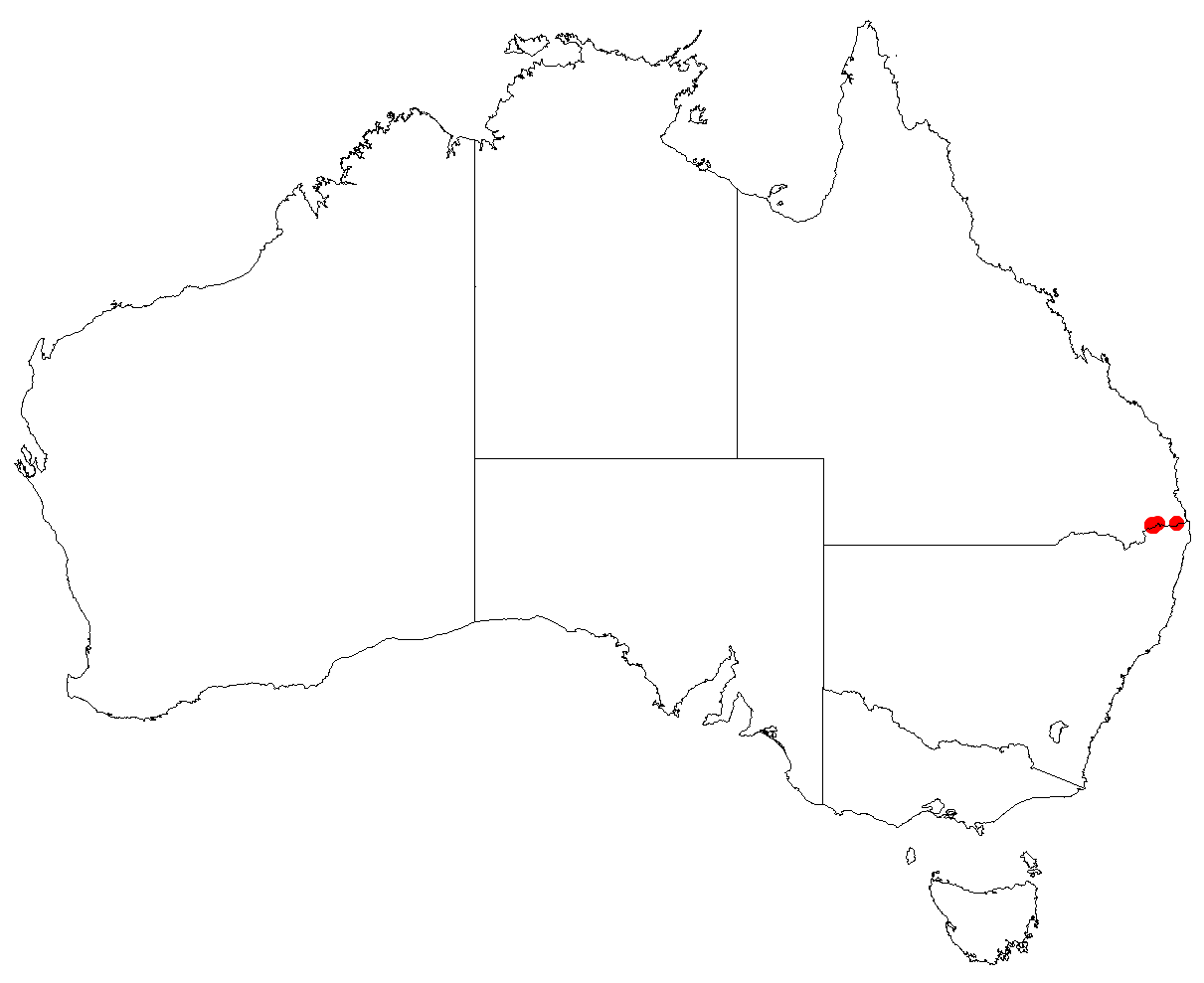
- Occurrence data from AVH

Species of mistletoe

Muellerina flexialabastra, common name Hoop pine mistletoe, is a hemiparasitic aerial shrub in the family Loranthaceae. The species is endemic to Queensland.

== Description ==
M. flexialabastra is a compact, bushy plant found in high altitude sub-tropical rainforests and the drier rainforests between Queensland and New South Wales. The inflorescence is a terminal raceme off a central axis, and the pink to red tubular flowers occur in strongly reflexed, decussate pairs with a central sessile flower. The ovoid fruits (6 – 15 mm long) are a red-blotched yellowish-green.

== Ecology ==
The main host on which M. flexialabastra grows is Hoop pine (Araucaria cunninghamii). An inventory of host plants for Muellerina flexialabastra is given by Downey.

Muellerina flexialabastra is not known to host any butterflies, but butterfly species using M. celastroides may use this mistletoe as well.

== Taxonomy ==
The species was first described by Paul Downey and Carol Wilson in 2004 as Muellerina flexialabastra. There are no synonyms.
