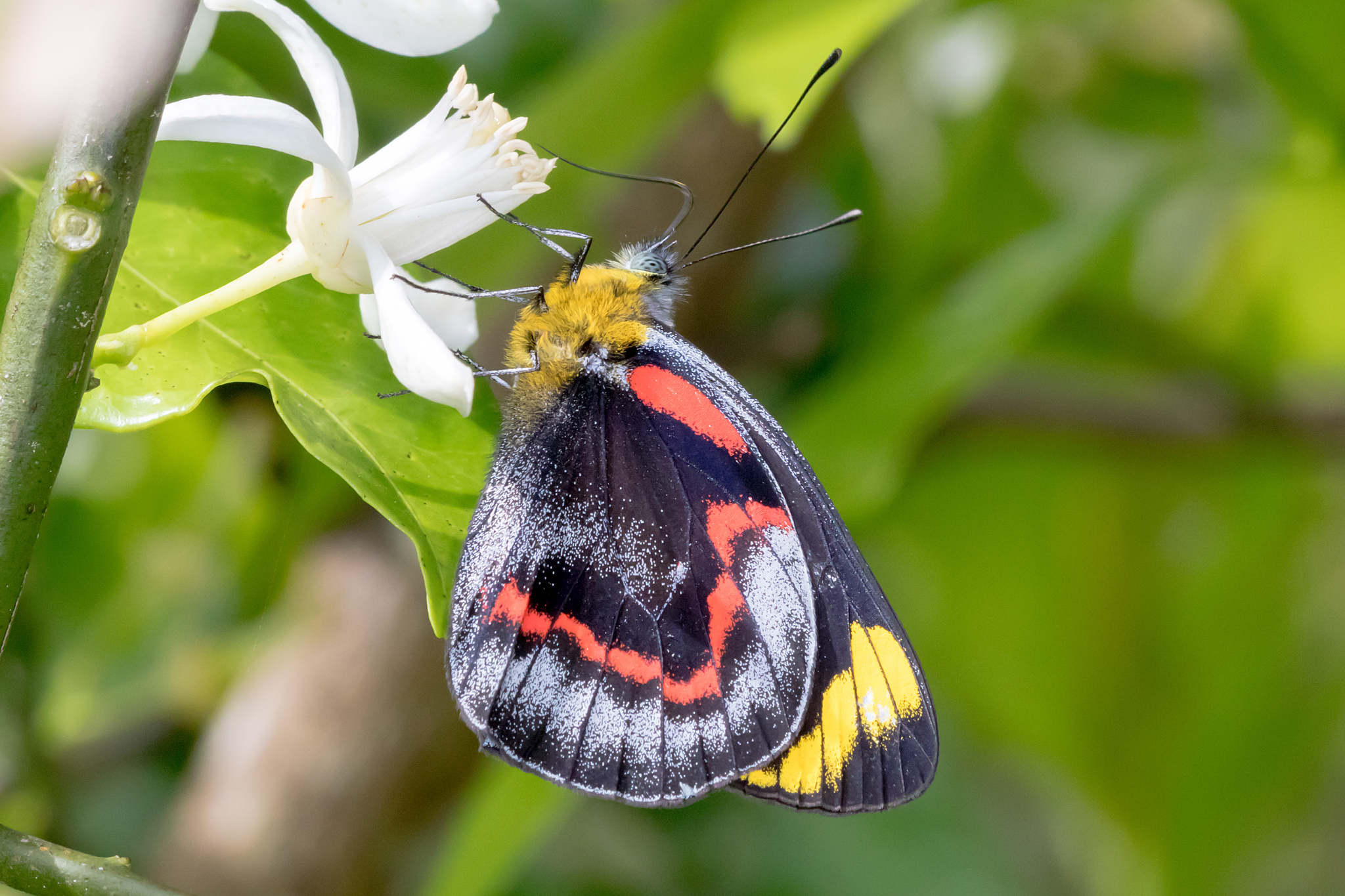

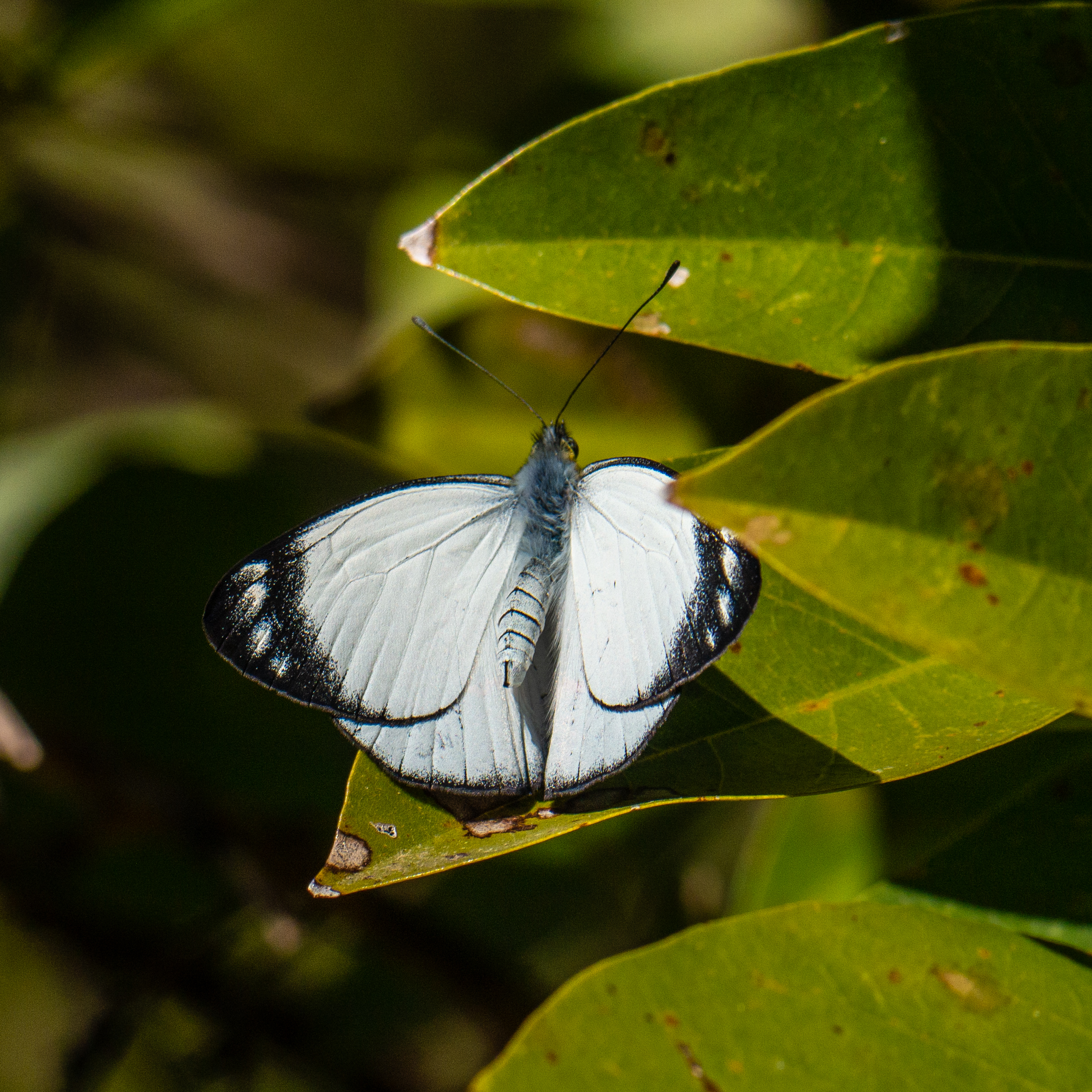

Scientific classification
- Kingdom: Animalia
- Phylum: Arthropoda
- Clade: Pancrustacea
- Class: Insecta
- Order: Lepidoptera
- Family: Pieridae
- Genus: Delias
- Species: D. nigrina

Binomial name
- Delias nigrina (Fabricius, 1775)

Synonyms
- Papilio nigrina Fabricius, 1775

= Delias nigrina =

Species of butterfly

Delias nigrina, the black Jezebel or common Jezebel (also used for Delias eucharis), is a butterfly in the family Pieridae. It is found along the eastern seaboard of Australia, from Queensland, through New South Wales to Victoria.

The wingspan of both the male and the female is 56 mm.

== Description ==
Male forewing is white wings with black tips containing white spots and narrow black margins on hindwings.Females have a grey upperside with broader black edges and white apical spots The underside of both sexes has a black ground a yellow band across the forewing and irregular red semiloops around hindwing. Rare yellow aberrations replace red markings with yellow.The body is predominantly black with red ventral markings.

The larvae feed on Amyema cambagei, Amyema congener, Amyema miquelii, Amyema quandang, Dendrophthoe curvata, Dendrophthoe glabrescens, Dendrophthoe vitellina, Muellerina celastroides and Muellerina eucalyptoides.

== Gallery ==
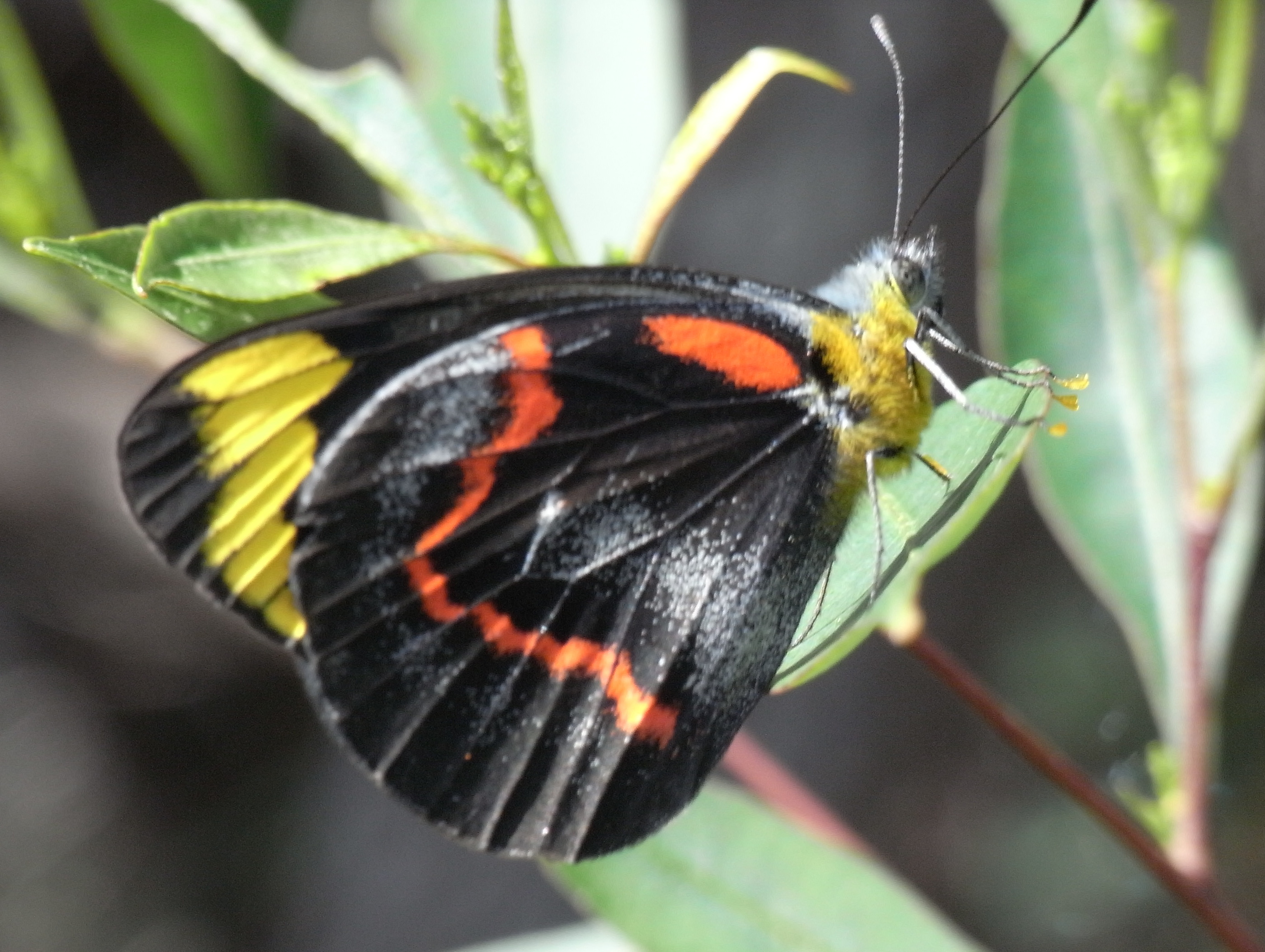

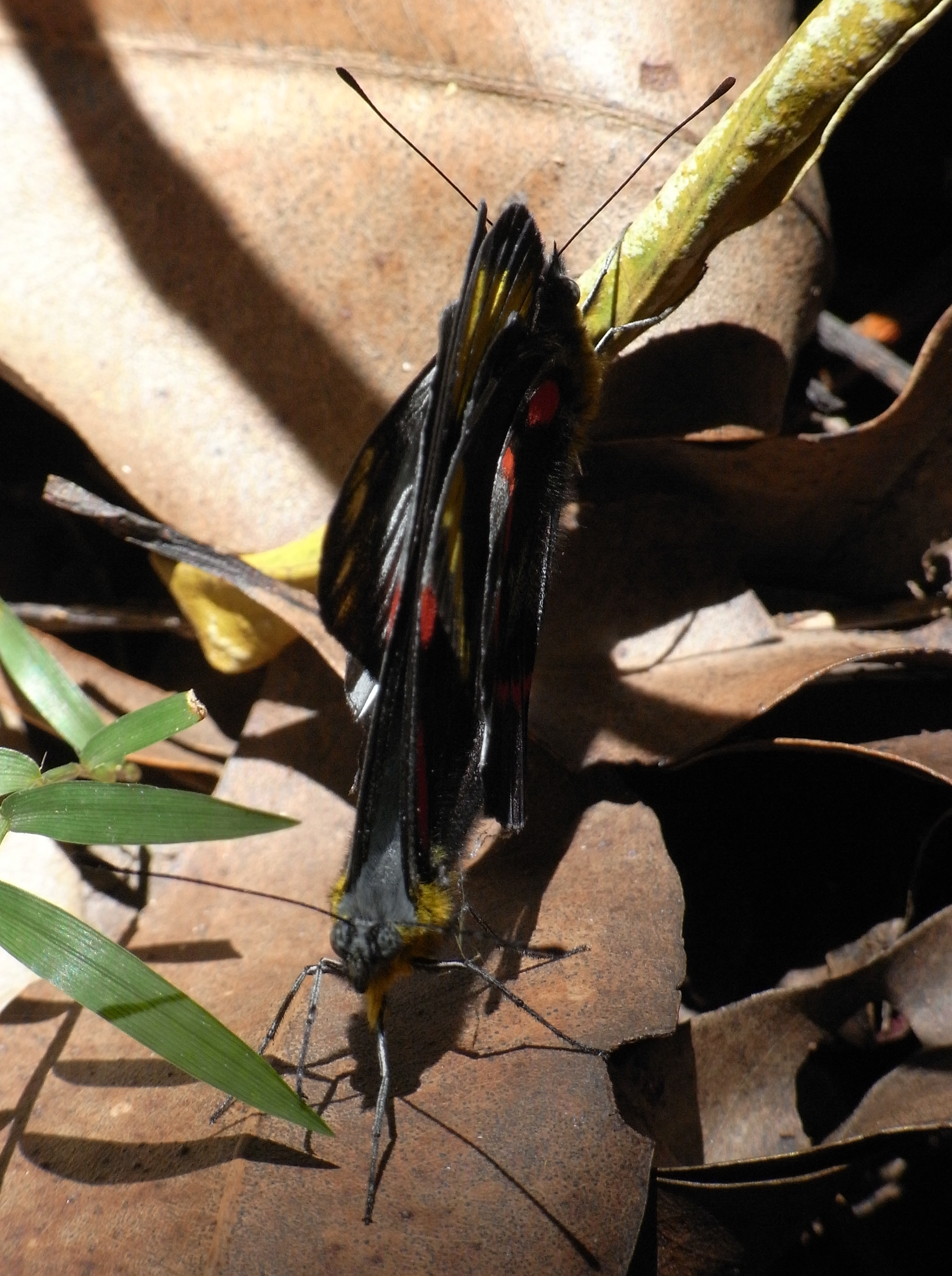
Mating, front view

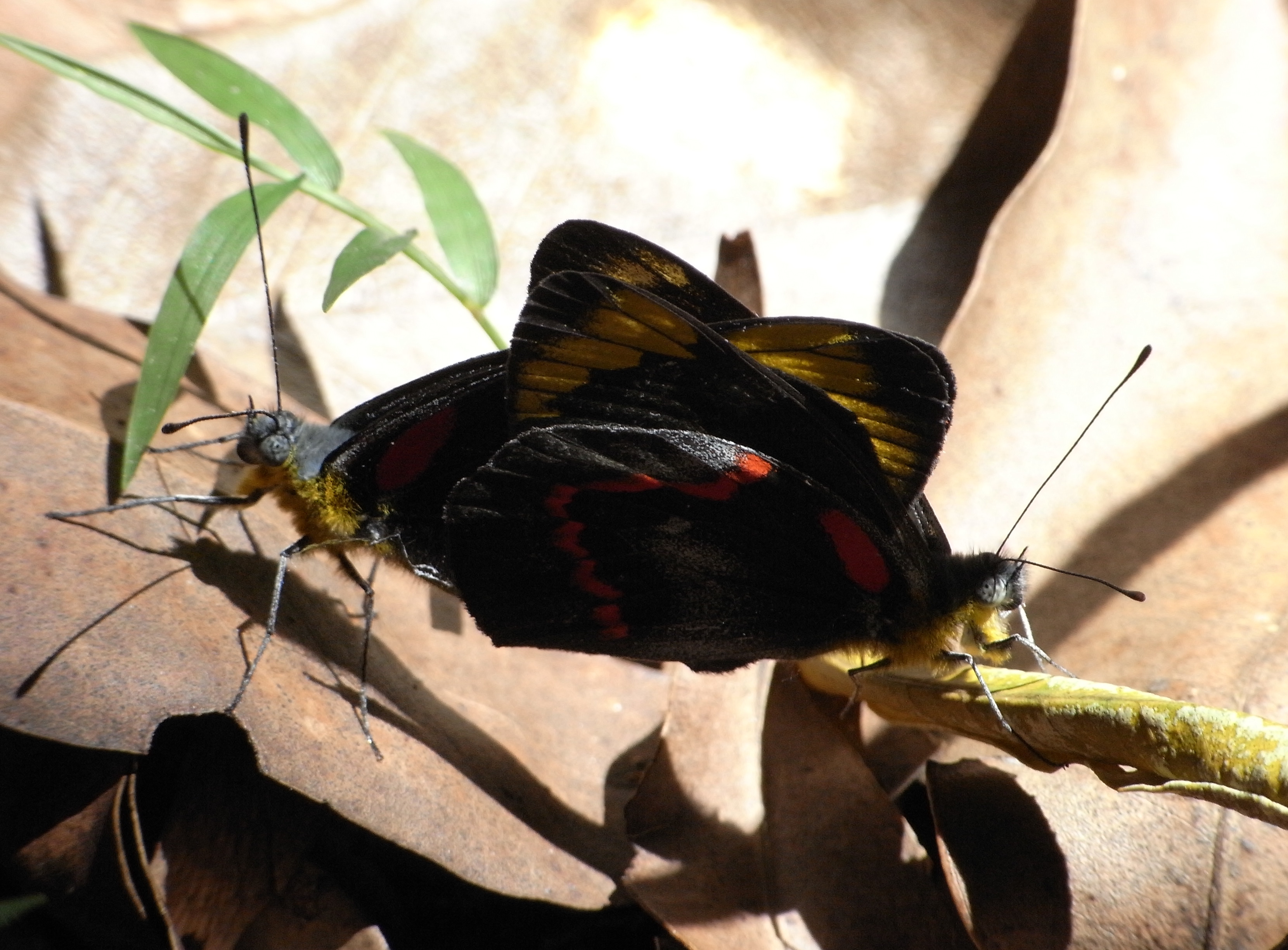
Mating, side view

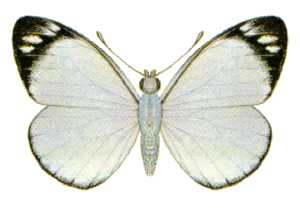
