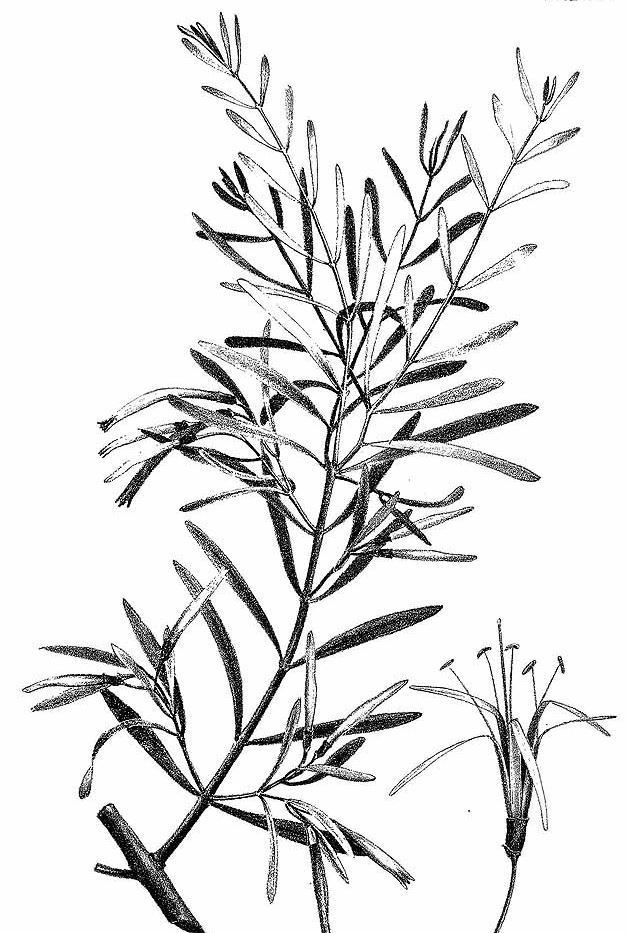
- Muellerina bidwillii (artist F.C.Wills)
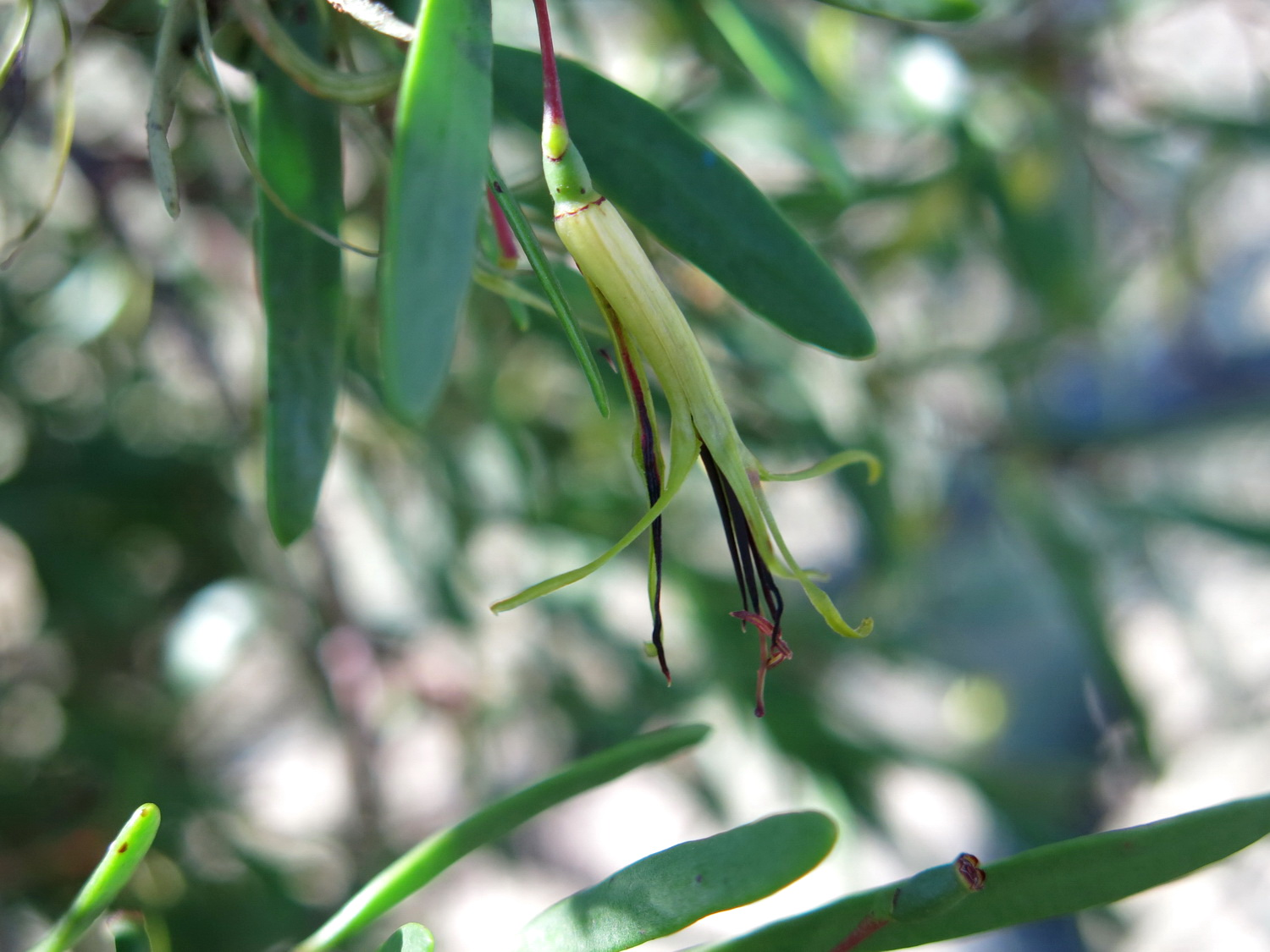

Scientific classification
- Kingdom: Plantae
- Clade: Embryophytes
- Clade: Tracheophytes
- Clade: Angiosperms
- Clade: Eudicots
- Order: Santalales
- Family: Loranthaceae
- Genus: Muellerina
- Species: M. bidwillii

Binomial name
- Muellerina bidwillii (Benth.) Barlow
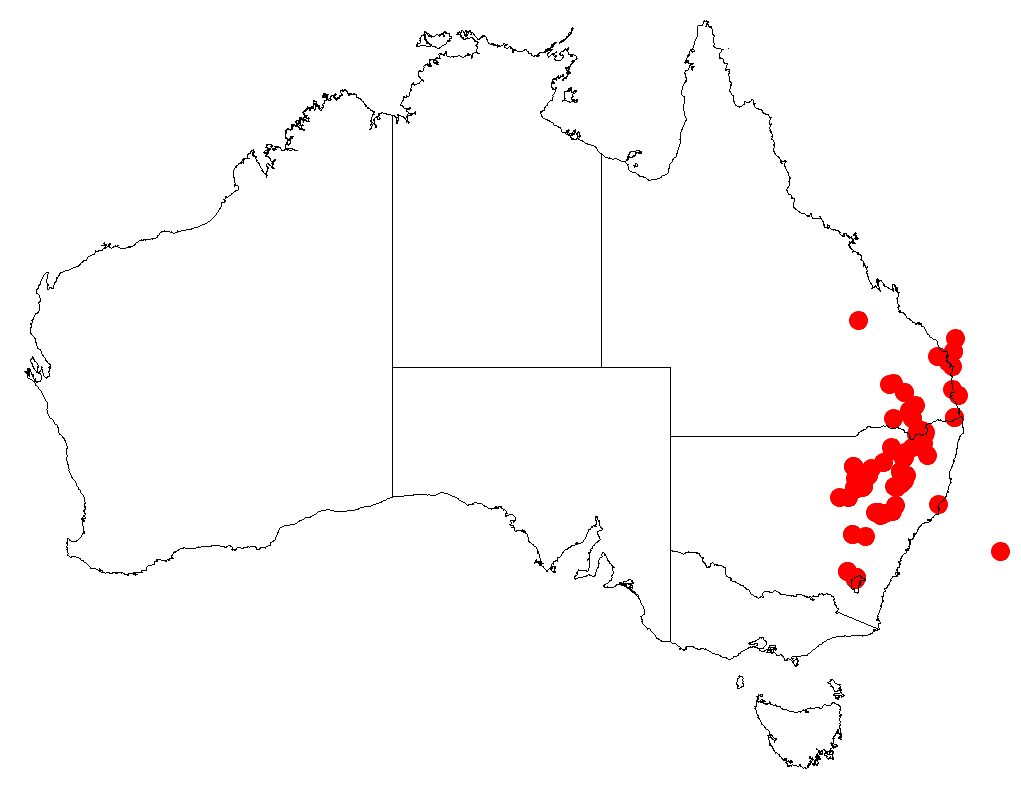
- Occurrence data from AVH

Synonyms
- Loranthus bidwillii Benth. Furcilla bidwillii (Benth.) Tiegh. Phrygilanthus bidwillii (Benth.) Eichler

= Muellerina bidwillii =

Species of mistletoe

Muellerina bidwillii, common name Cypress-pine mistletoe, is a hemiparasitic aerial shrub in the family Loranthaceae. The species is endemic to New South Wales and Queensland.

== Description ==
M. bidwillii is an erect to spreading plant, the branches and leaves of which are smooth (or having a few scattered hairs on the inflorescence axes). The leaves are linear to oblanceolate and rounded at the tip. The leaf blade is from 1.5 to 3 cm long and 1.5 to 3 mm wide, with obscure venation and an obscure petiole. The inflorescence a 2-flowered simple umbel on a peduncle which is from 3 to 6 mm long. The corolla in the mature bud is 20–27 mm long, and the flower has anthers 1–1.5 mm long, with the free part of filament being 8–10 mm long. The pink or red fruit is pear-shaped to spherical and from 6 to 8 mm long.

== Ecology ==
The main hosts on which M. bidwillii grows are Callitris species, in particular Callitris glaucophylla. An inventory of host plants for Muellerina bidwillii spp. is given by Downey.

Muellerina bidwillii is not known to host any butterflies.

== Taxonomy ==
The species was first described by George Bentham in 1867 as Loranthus bidwillii. It was redescribed by B.A.Barlow in 1962 as Muellerina bidwillii, with the current description of the species being that of Barlow in 1984.

== Gallery ==
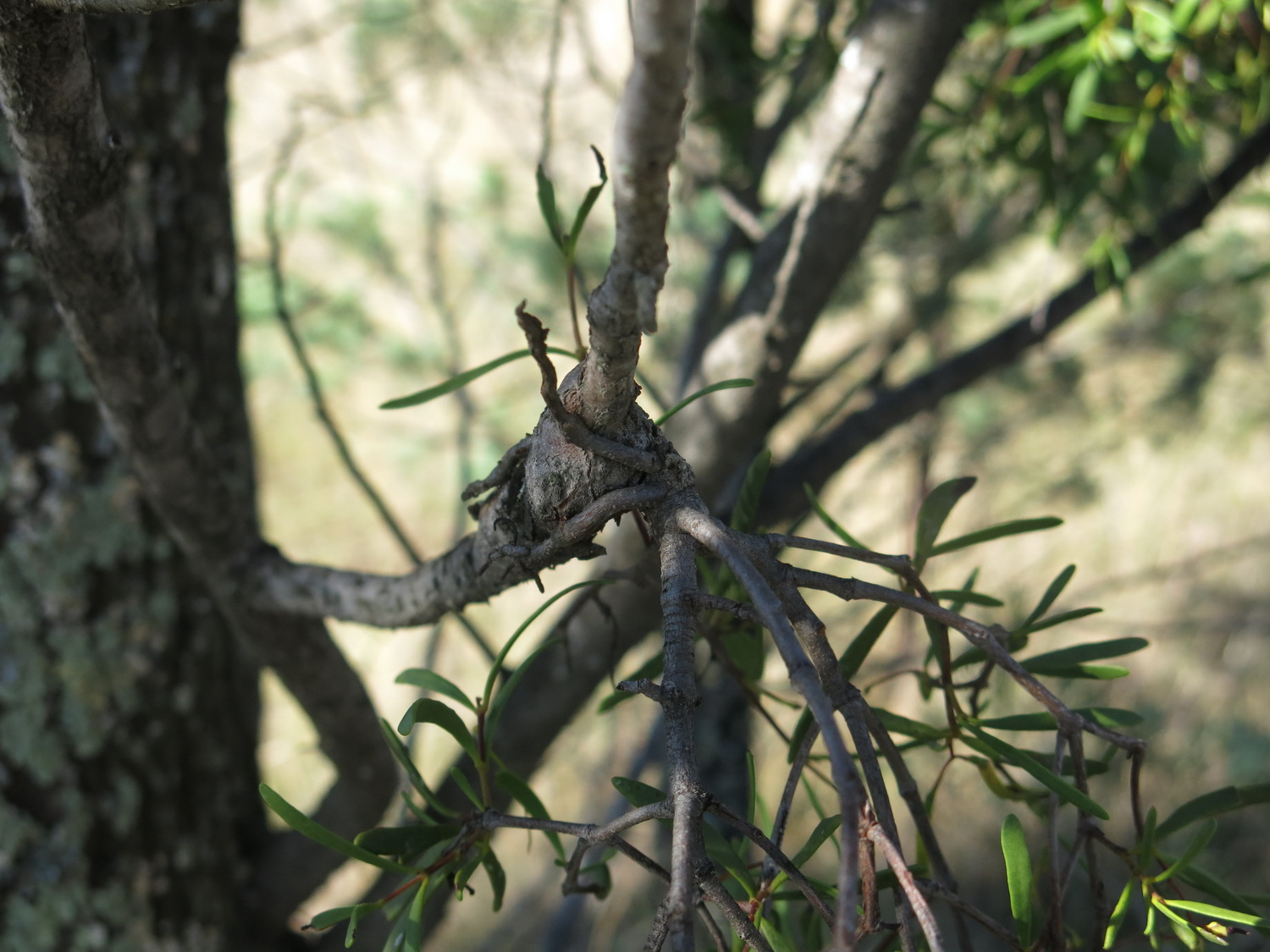
Haustorium on Callitris glaucophylla

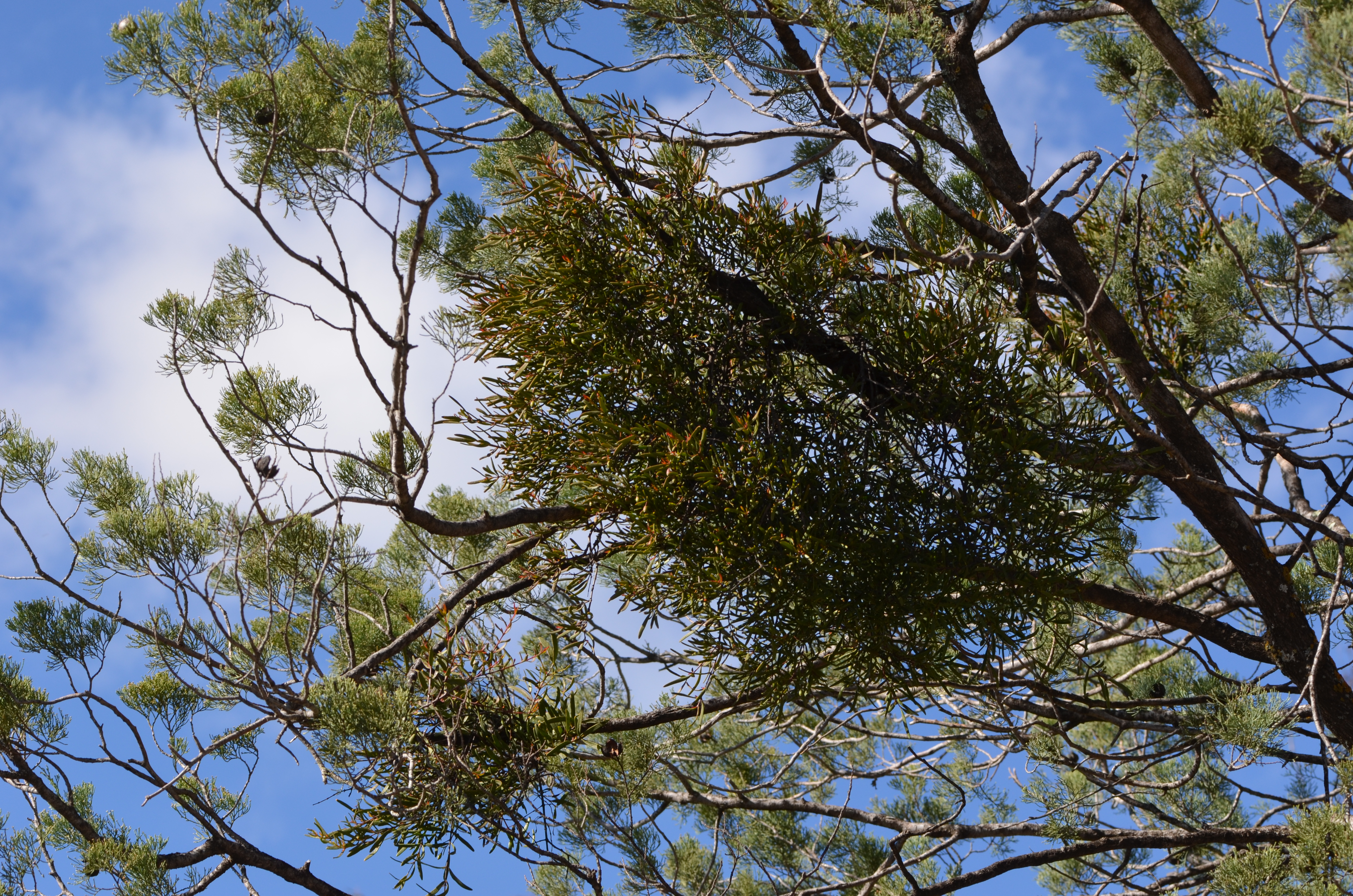
plant on Callitris glaucophylla
