= Muellerina myrtifolia =

Scientific classification
- Kingdom: Plantae
- Clade: Tracheophytes
- Clade: Angiosperms
- Clade: Eudicots
- Order: Santalales
- Family: Loranthaceae
- Genus: Muellerina
- Species: M. myrtifolia

Binomial name
- Muellerina myrtifolia (A.Cunn. ex Benth.) Barlow
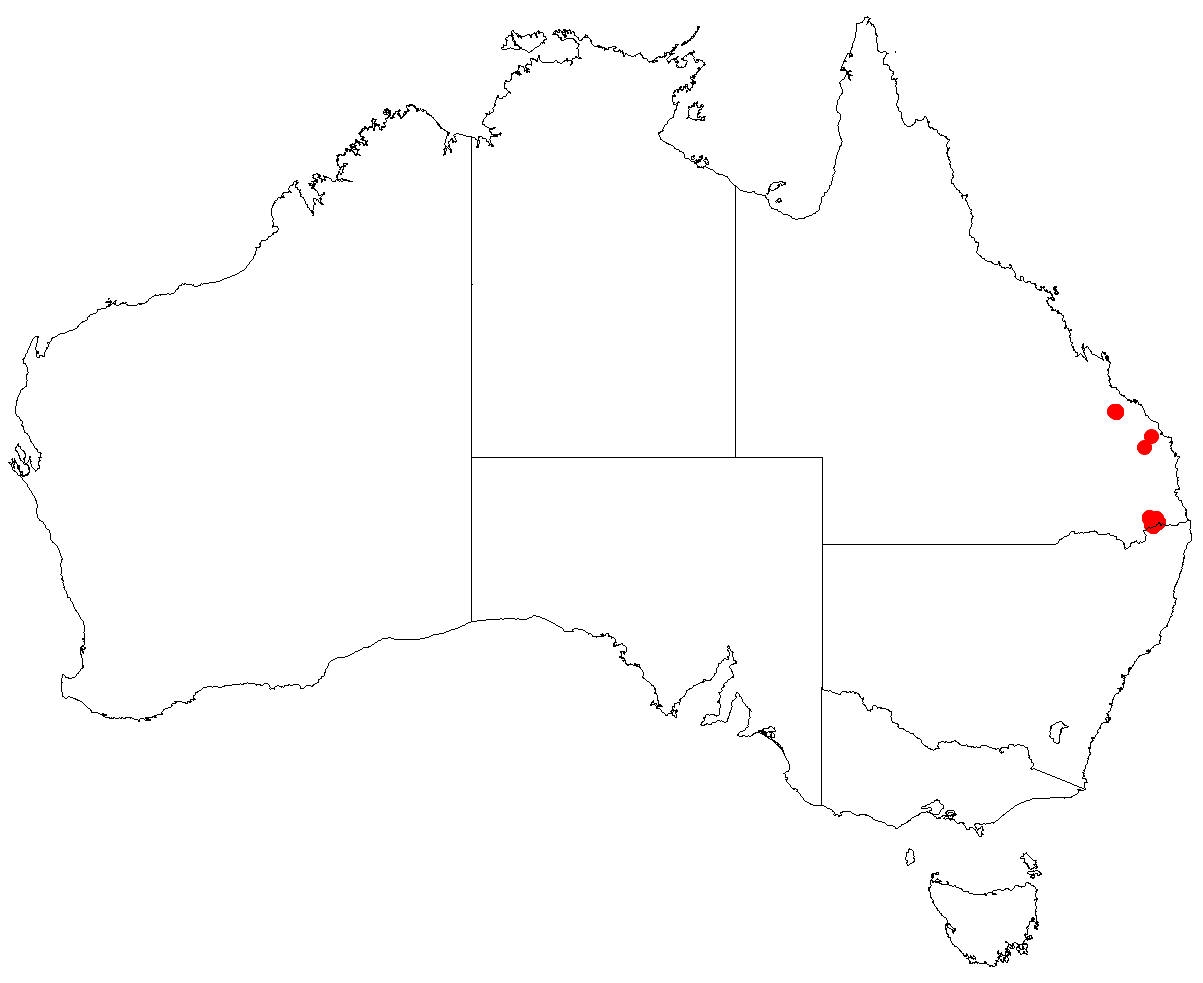
- Occurrence data from AVH

Synonyms
- Furcilla myrtifolia (A.Cunn. ex Benth.) Tiegh. Loranthus myrtifolius A.Cunn. ex Benth. Phrygilanthus myrtifolius (A.Cunn. ex Benth.) Eichler; Tupeia myrtifolia (A.Cunn. ex Benth.) Chalon

Species of mistletoe

Muellerina myrtifolia, common name myrtle-leaved mistletoe, is a hemiparasitic aerial shrub in the family Loranthaceae. The species is endemic to New South Wales and Queensland.

== Description ==
M. myrtifolia is a rainforest mistletoe with small ovate, sessile leaves with a shiny upper surface and a dull lower surface, and measuring 15–20 mm long. New growth is russet-coloured. The inflorescence is a paired umbel which hangs from the foliage on long stalks, with each flower being a long red and yellow or red and white tube with dark, projecting stamens. The oval shaped fruit are a dull green which ripens to a brownish-red, and have a prominent flower-scars.

== Ecology ==
The main hosts on which M. myrtifolia grows are vines, in particular, Wonga vine (Pandorea pandorana), Jasminum species, and Parsonsia species. An inventory of host plants for Muellerina myrtifolia is given by Downey.

Muellerina myrtifolia is not known to host any butterflies.

== Taxonomy ==
The species was first described by George Bentham in 1867 as Loranthus myrtifolius. It was redescribed by B.A.Barlow in 1962 as Muellerina myrtifolia, with the current description of the species being that of Barlow in 1984.
