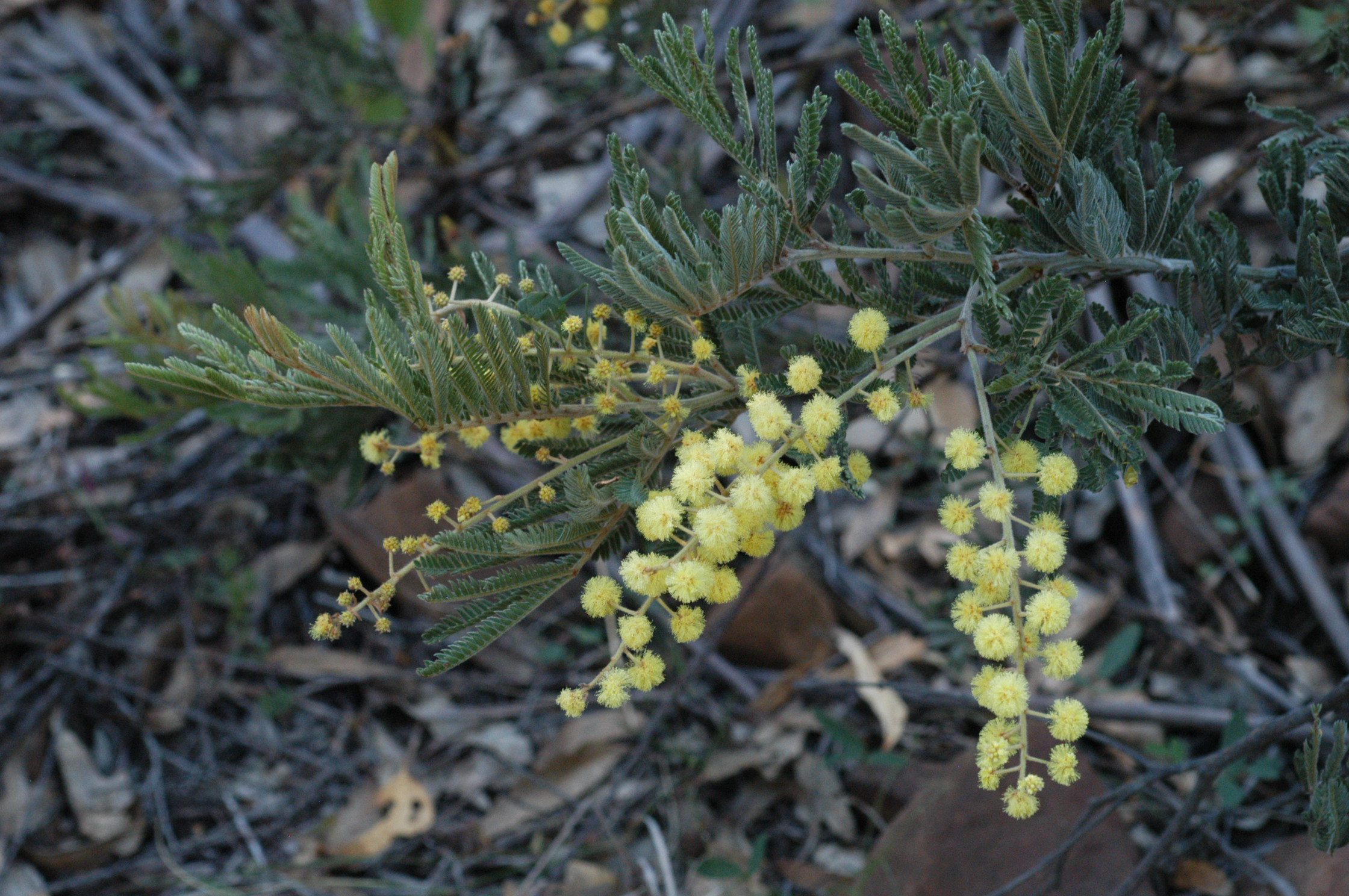

Scientific classification
- Kingdom: Plantae
- Clade: Tracheophytes
- Clade: Angiosperms
- Clade: Eudicots
- Clade: Rosids
- Order: Fabales
- Family: Fabaceae
- Subfamily: Caesalpinioideae
- Clade: Mimosoid clade
- Genus: Acacia
- Species: A. fulva

Binomial name
- Acacia fulva Tindale
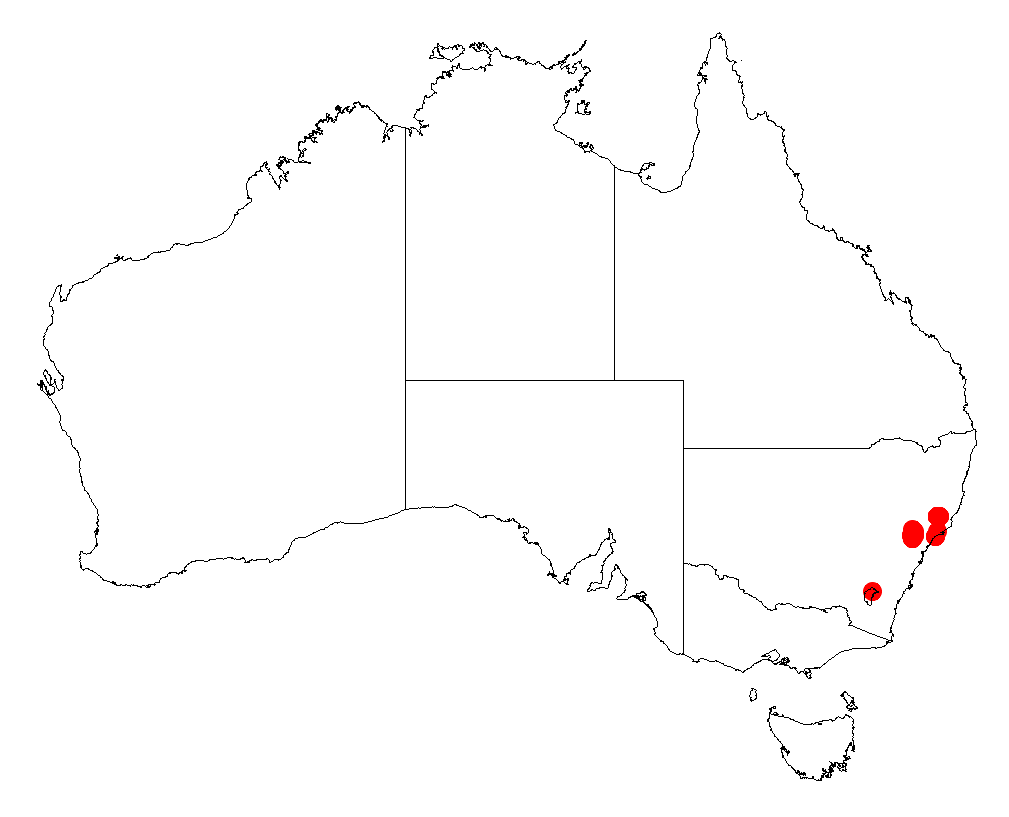
- Occurrence data from AVH

Synonyms
- Racosperma fulvum (Tindale) Pedley

= Acacia fulva =

Velvet wattle

Species of legume

Acacia fulva, known colloquially as velvet wattle or soft wattle, is a species of flowering plant in the family Fabaceae and is endemic to New South Wales, Australia. It is an erect shrub or tree with silvery greyish, bipinnate leaves, spherical heads of bright yellow flowers and straight to slightly curved, thickly leathery pods, barely to slightly constricted between the seeds.

== Description ==
Acacia fulva is a shrub or tree that typically grows to a height of 1.5–10 m (4 ft 11 in – 32 ft 10 in) and has smooth bark at first, later rough and corrugated. Its branchlets are covered with velvety, silvery grey or chestnut-coloured hairs. The leaves are silvery greyish, bipinnate on a rachis 20–80 mm (0.79–3.15 in) long with four to twelve pairs of pinnae 39–75 mm (1.5–3.0 in) long, each with 11 to 28 pairs of egg-shaped, lance-shaped or oblong pinnules 3–10 mm (0.12–0.39 in) long and 1–2 mm (0.039–0.079 in) wide, with silvery hairs, more densely arranged on the lower surface. The flowers are borne in spherical heads in racemes or panicles, each head 6–8.5 mm (0.24–0.33 in) in diameter with 24 to 48 bright yellow flowers. Flowering occurs from November to June, and the pods are straight to slightly curved, thickly leathery, 20–120 mm (0.79–4.72 in) long, 4–6.5 mm (0.16–0.26 in) wide, dark brown and velvety with soft, chestnut-coloured and silvery hairs.

== Taxonomy ==
Acacia fulva was first formally described in 1966 by Mary Tindale in Contributions from the New South Wales National Herbarium from specimens collected by Ernest Constable on the northern slopes of Mount Wareng in Howes Valley in 1963. The specific epithet (fulva) means 'reddish-yellow'.

Specimens of Acacia fulva were previously assigned to the species A. mollifolia until Mary Tindale described it as a separate species in 1966.

== Distribution and habitat ==
Velvet wattle grows on soils derived from sandstone and basalt in woodland, from Gloucester Buckets, Apple Tree Flat in the Hunter Region, Hayes Creek (near Bulga) and Mount Yengo. It is associated with such species as forest red gum (Eucalyptus tereticornis), grey box (E. moluccana), and narrow-leaved ironbark (E. crebra), and shrubs such as dogwood (Jacksonia scoparia), Exocarpus, Clerodendrum, Clematis and Senecio.

== See also ==
- List of Acacia species
