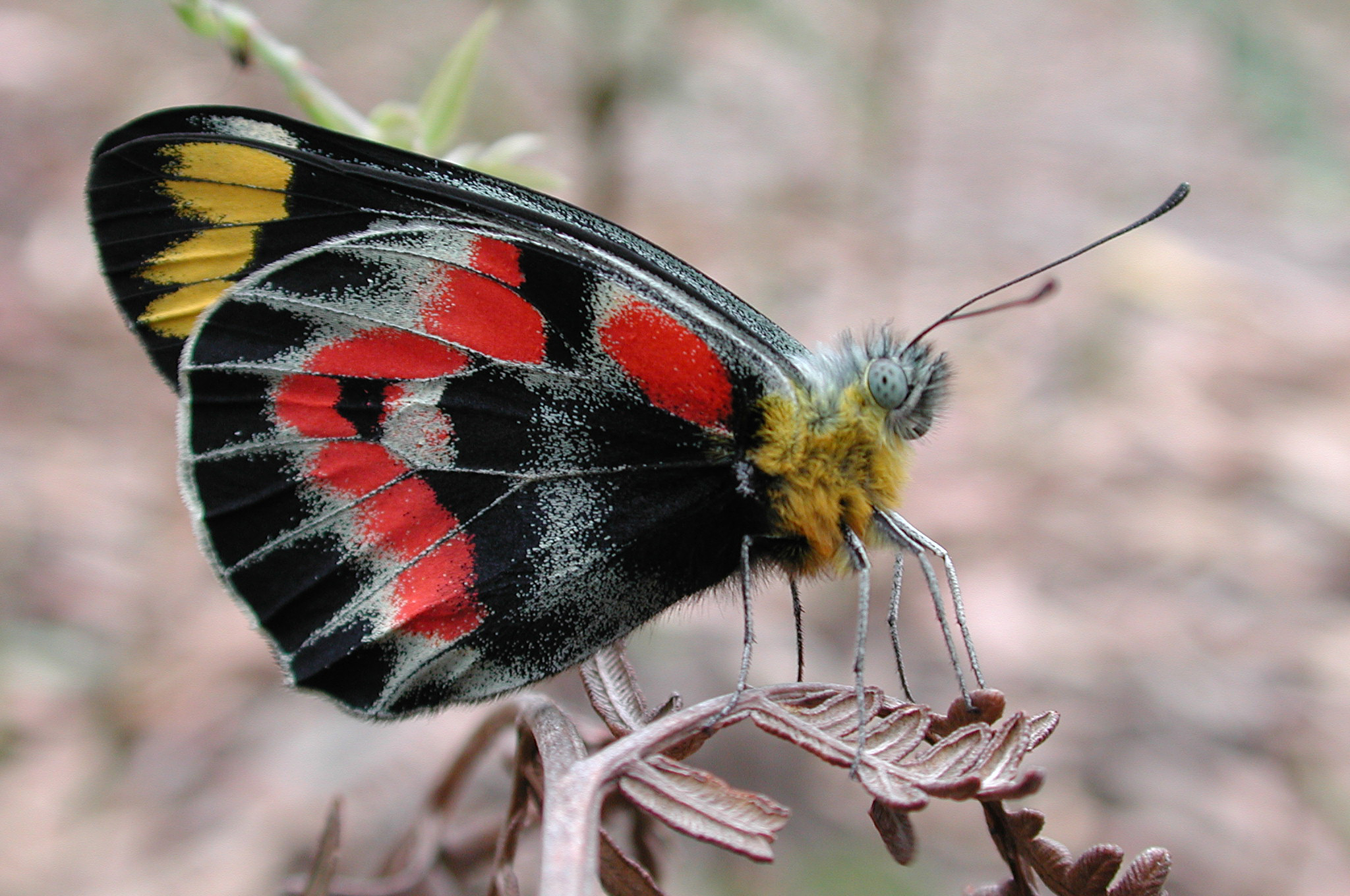
- Live individual, ventral view
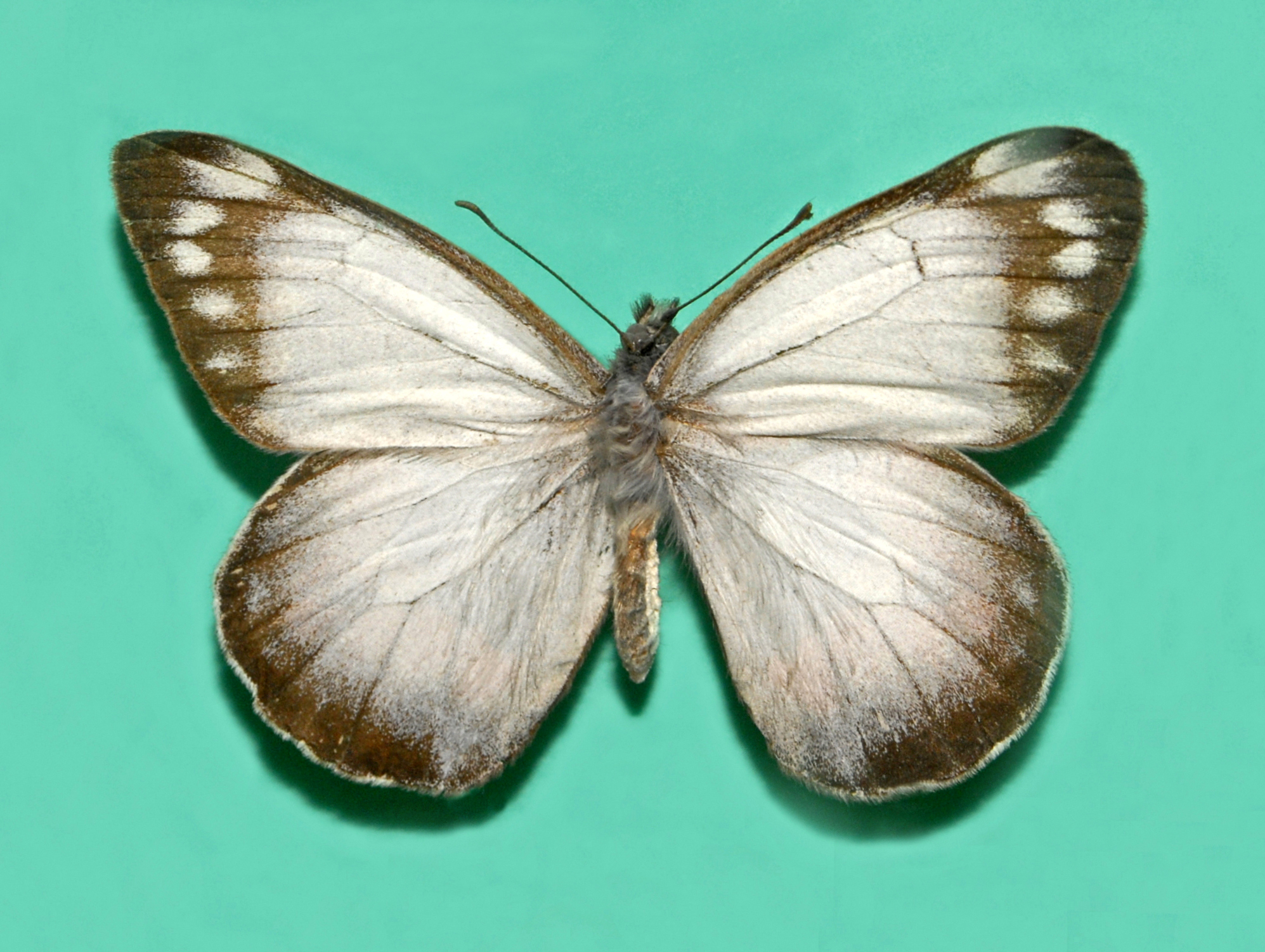
- Museum specimen, dorsal view

Scientific classification
- Kingdom: Animalia
- Phylum: Arthropoda
- Class: Insecta
- Order: Lepidoptera
- Family: Pieridae
- Genus: Delias
- Species: D. harpalyce

Binomial name
- Delias harpalyce Donovan, 1805

= Delias harpalyce =

Imperial white

Species of butterfly

Delias harpalyce, the imperial white, is a butterfly in the family Pieridae. It is endemic to Australia.

== Description ==
The wingspan of Delias harpalyce reaches about 60–70 millimetres (2.4–2.8 in). The upper surfaces of the forewings and hindwings are a whitish with black margins and a row of small whitish spots on the apex of the forewings. In the females the black outer edges of the wings are wider than in males. The undersides of the wings are chequered whitish and black, with a yellow band on the apex of the forewings and a red band on the middle of the hindwings.

The larvae are about 4 cm in length, with a black body covered by white hairs. These gregarious caterpillars spin a silken web on their host plants, including Amyema, Muellerina and Dendrophthoe species.

== Distribution and habitat ==
This species can be found in Australia (New South Wales, Victoria, and South Australia). It lives in the eucalypt forests. Mostly flies high, but congregates in the spring (beginning of October) round flowering fruit-trees and is then easy to catch (Seitz Mts.).
