= Acacia mollifolia =

- In the Australian National Botanic Gardens

Scientific classification
- Kingdom: Plantae
- Clade: Tracheophytes
- Clade: Angiosperms
- Clade: Eudicots
- Clade: Rosids
- Order: Fabales
- Family: Fabaceae
- Subfamily: Caesalpinioideae
- Clade: Mimosoid clade
- Genus: Acacia
- Species: A. mollifolia

Binomial name
- Acacia mollifolia Maiden & Blakely
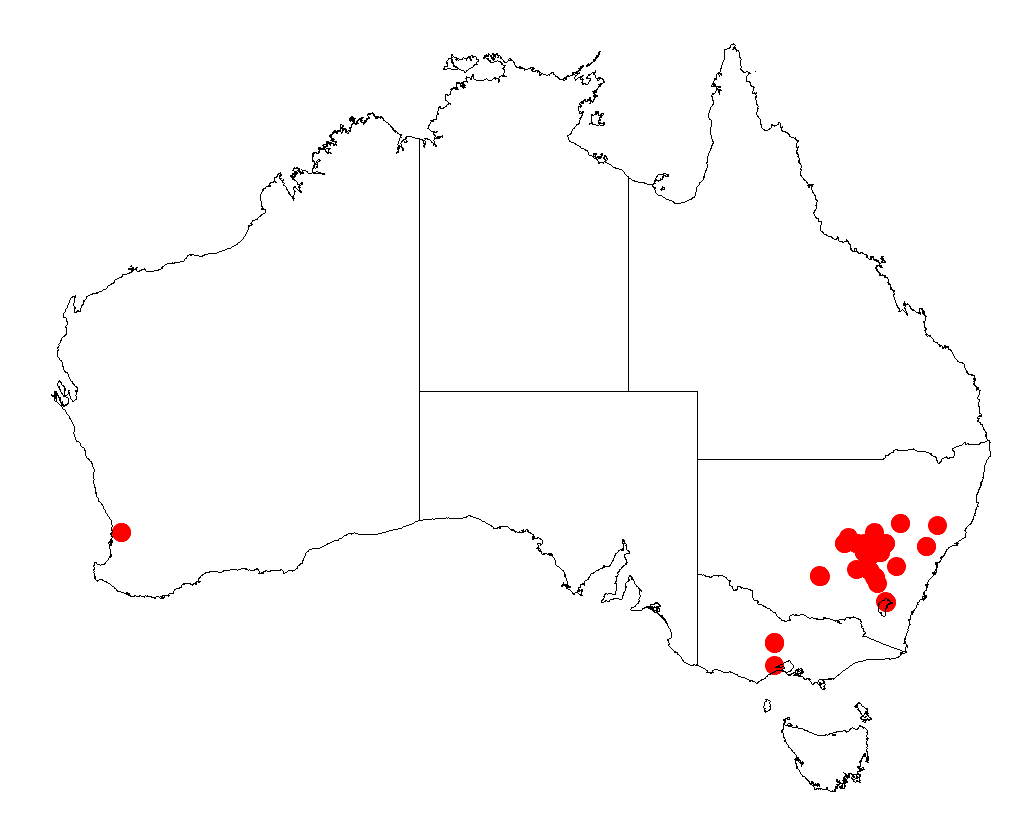
- Occurrence data from AVH

Synonyms
- Acacia decurrens var. lanigera Maiden; Racosperma mollifolium (Maiden & Blakely) Pedley

Species of legume

Acacia mollifolia, commonly known as the hairy silver wattle, velvet acacia and hoary silver wattle is a species of flowering plant in the family Fabaceae, and is endemic to the New South Wales, Australia. It is a spreading or erect shrub to small tree with terete branchlets, silvery grey bipinnate leaves, spherical heads of bright yellow flowers, and straight to slightly curved pods that usually somewhat resemble a string of beads.

== Description ==
Acacia mollifolia is a spreading to erect shrub or small tree that typically grows to a height of 1.5–6 m (4 ft 11 in – 19 ft 8 in) and has smooth to finely fissured grey to black or dark brown bark. Its branchlets are terete with pale rusty to silvery grey coloured ridges. The leaves are bipinnate on a rachis mostly 10–45 mm (0.39–1.77 in) long on a petiole 2–7 mm (0.079–0.276 in) long with 4 to 10 pairs of pinna 5–40 mm (0.20–1.57 in) long. Each pinna has 7 to 27 pairs of silvery grey, narrowly oblong to linear pinnules. The flowers are borne in racemes in leaf axils or in panicles on the ends of branchlets on peduncles 2–7 mm (0.079–0.276 in) long, each head 3–6 mm (0.12–0.24 in) in diameter with 20 to 40 bright yellow flowers. Flowering has been recorded from February to May and in July, August and November. The pods are straight to slightly curved, more or less flat, 30–120 mm (1.2–4.7 in) long and 4–7 mm (0.16–0.28 in) wide, usually somewhat resembling a string of beads or barely constricted between the seeds.

== Taxonomy ==
In 1906, Joseph Maiden described Acacia decurrens var. lanigera in his book Wattles and Wattle-barks. In 1927, Joseph Maiden and William Blakely raised the variety to species status as Acacia mollifolia in the Journal and Proceedings of the Royal Society of New South Wales. The specific epithet is formed from the Latin words mollis meaning 'soft or pliant' and folium meaning 'leaf' in reference to the soft, hairy leaves.

== Distribution ==
Hairy silver wattle is endemic to inland New South Wales and mainly occurs west of Peakhill, Boorowa and Bathurst to near Rankins Springs, where it grows in forest or open woodland, usually on sandstone and often on ridges.

== See also ==
- List of Acacia species
