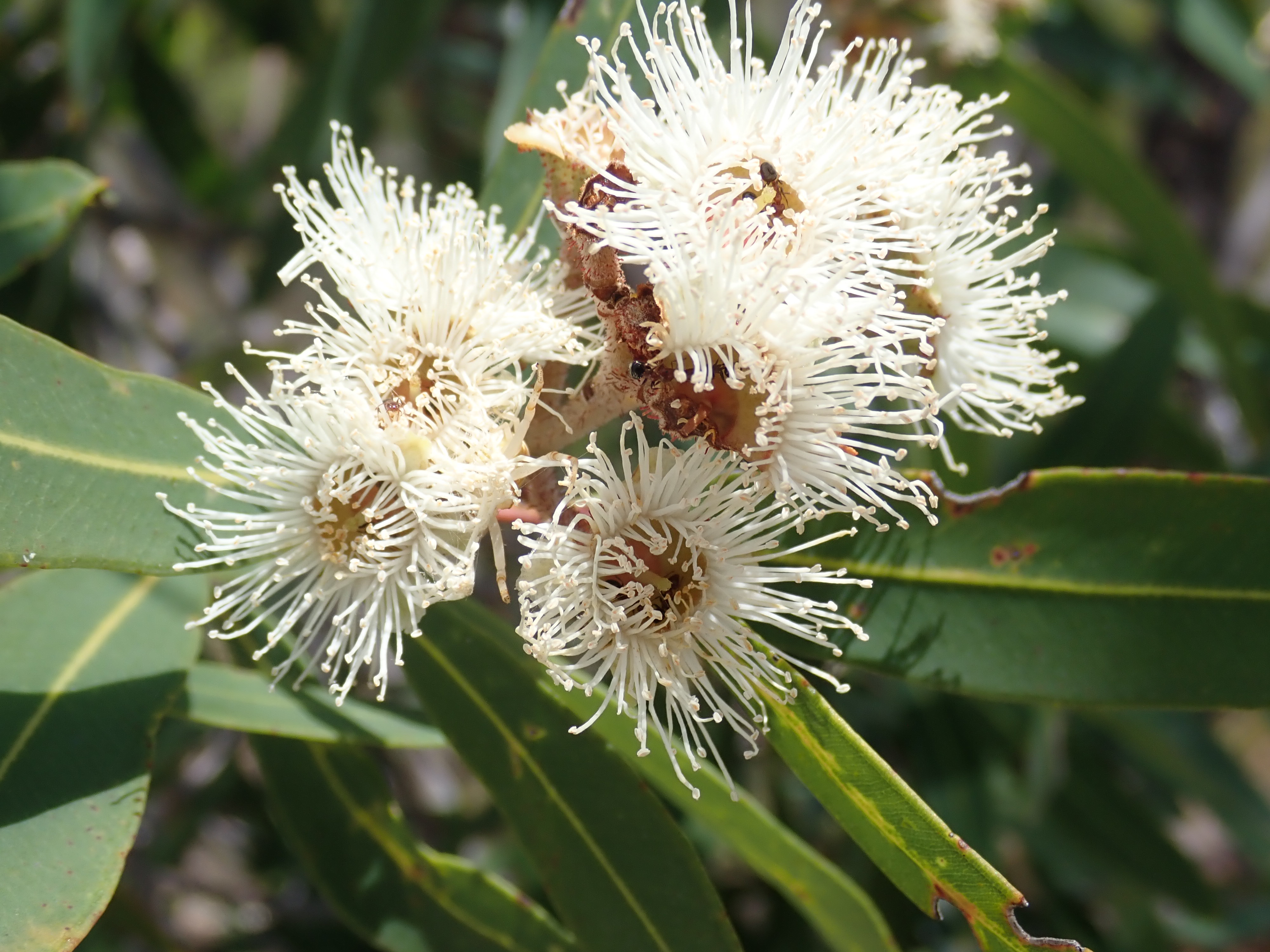
- Flowers of Angophora bakeri subsp. crassifolia in Ku-ring-gai Chase National Park

Scientific classification
- Kingdom: Plantae
- Clade: Tracheophytes
- Clade: Angiosperms
- Clade: Eudicots
- Clade: Rosids
- Order: Myrtales
- Family: Myrtaceae
- Genus: Angophora
- Species: A. bakeri
- Subspecies: A. b. subsp. crassifolia

Trinomial name
- Angophora bakeri subsp. crassifolia G.J.Leach

Synonyms
- Angophora crassifolia (G.J.Leach) L.A.S.Johnson & K.D.Hill; Eucalyptus crassifolia (G.J.Leach) Brooker

= Angophora bakeri subsp. crassifolia =

Subspecies of tree

Angophora bakeri subsp. crassifolia is a small, shrubby tree or mallee that is endemic to a small area of New South Wales. It has rough bark on the trunk and branches, thick, rigid lance-shaped leaves, flower buds in groups of three or seven, white or creamy white flowers and cup-shaped to barrel-shaped fruit. It is similar to subspecies bakeri, differing in its smaller habit, thick leaves and slightly larger fruit.

== Description ==
Angophora bakeri subsp. crassifolia is a small, shrubby tree or mallee that typically grows to a height of 10 m (33 ft) and forms a lignotuber. It has rough, fibrous bark on the trunk and branches. Young plants and coppice regrowth have more or less sessile elliptical to egg-shaped leaves that are 50–80 mm (2.0–3.1 in) long and 10–20 mm (0.39–0.79 in) wide and arranged in opposite pairs. Adult leaves are arranged in opposite pairs, a paler shade of green on the lower surface, thick, rigid, lance-shaped to curved, 50–110 mm (2.0–4.3 in) long and 10–20 mm (0.39–0.79 in) wide, tapering to a petiole 4–10 mm (0.16–0.39 in) long. The flower buds are arranged on the ends of branchlets in groups of three or seven on a peduncle 8–20 mm (0.31–0.79 in) long, the individual buds on pedicels 7–10 mm (0.28–0.39 in) long. Mature buds are spherical, 5–7 mm (0.20–0.28 in) long and wide, the petals white with a green keel, about 3 mm (0.12 in) long and 4 mm (0.16 in) wide. Flowering occurs from November to January and the fruit is a cup-shaped to barrel-shaped capsule 9–10 mm (0.35–0.39 in) long and 9–12 mm (0.35–0.47 in) wide with the valves enclosed in the fruit.

Subspecies crassifolia differs from subsp. bakeri in its smaller habit, thicker, less flexible leaves and slightly larger fruit.

== Taxonomy and naming ==
Angophora bakeri was first formally described in 1913 by Edwin Cuthbert Hall and in 1986 Gregory John Leach described two subspecies in the journal Telopea, including subspecies crassifolia. The original specimens were collected by Leach near Mona Vale Road, Terrey Hills in 1975. The epithet (crassifolia) is from the Latin crassus meaning "thick" and folium meaning "leaf".

== Distribution and habitat ==
Subspecies crassifolia grows in sandy soil over sandstone north from near Middle Harbour to Ku-ring-gai Chase National Park. The distribution of this subspecies is not known to overlap that of subsp. bakeri.
