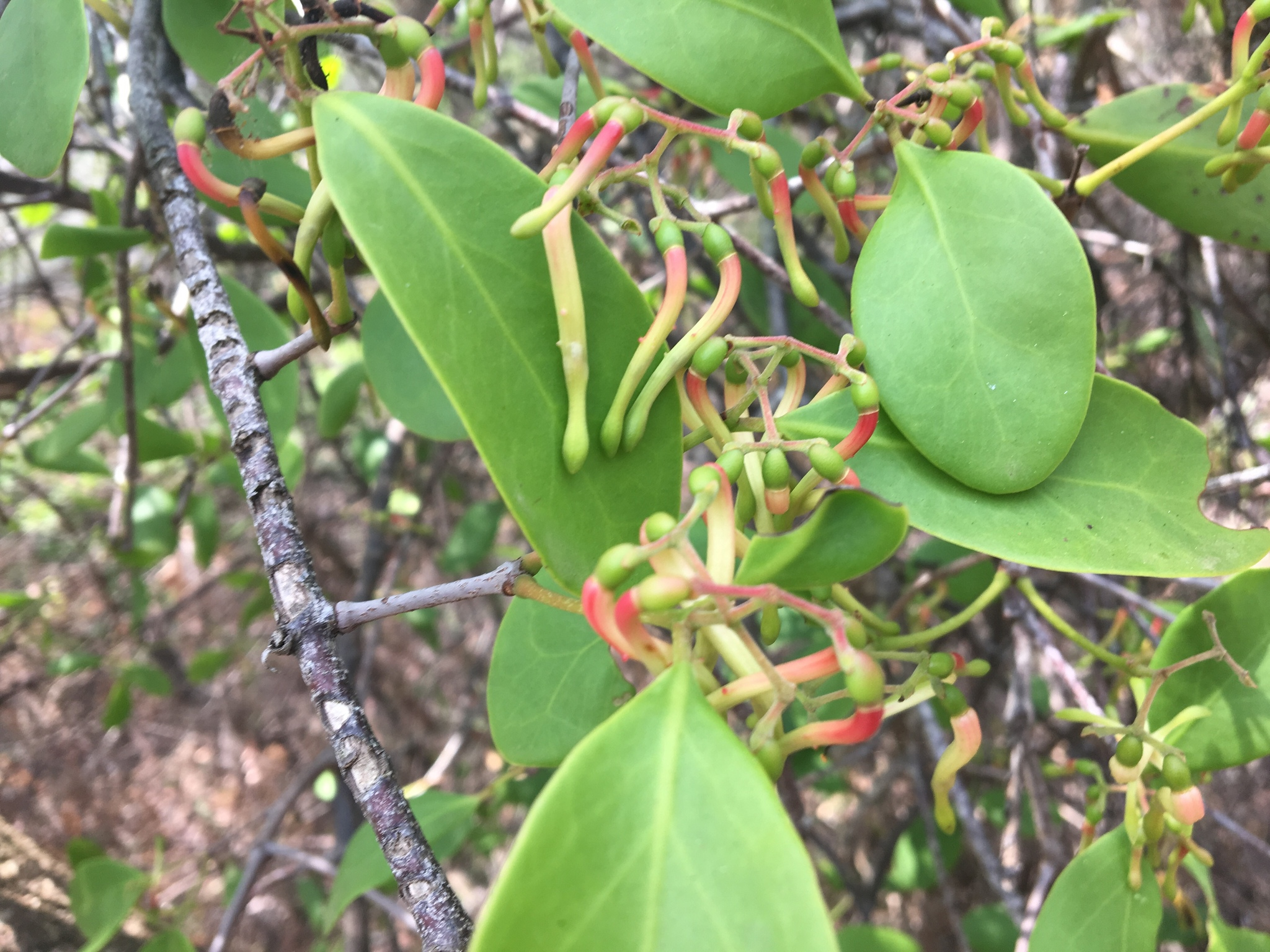

Scientific classification
- Kingdom: Plantae
- Clade: Tracheophytes
- Clade: Angiosperms
- Clade: Eudicots
- Order: Santalales
- Family: Loranthaceae
- Genus: Muellerina
- Species: M. celastroides

Binomial name
- Muellerina celastroides (Sieber ex Schult. & Schult.f.) Tiegh.
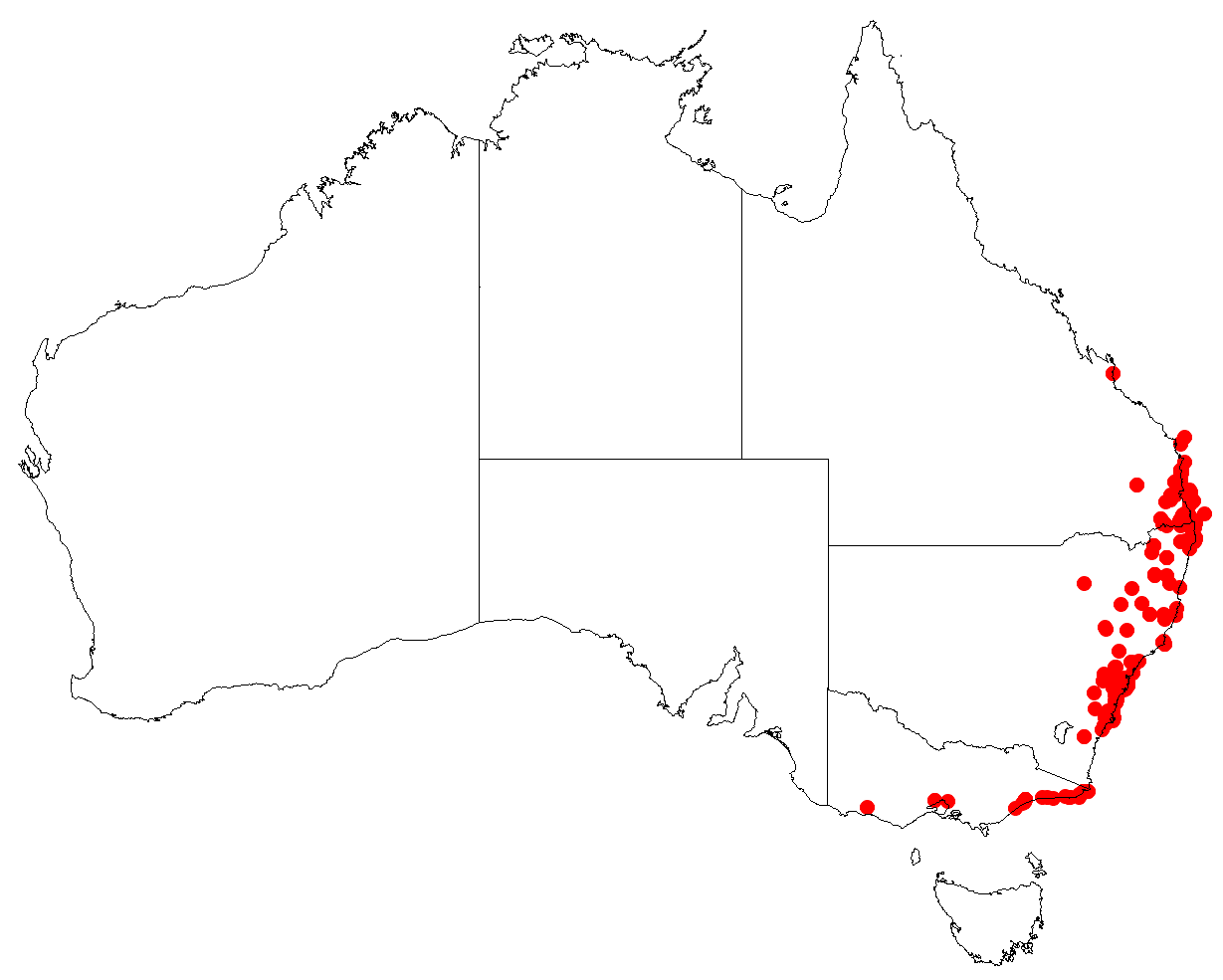
- Occurrence data from AVH

Synonyms
- Dendrophthoe celastroides (Sieber ex Schult. & Schult.f.) Mart. Loranthus celastroides Sieber ex Schult. & Schult.f. Phrygilanthus celastroides (Sieber ex Schult. & Schult.f.) Eichler nom. illeg. Loranthus celastroides var. typicus Domin nom. inval. Loranthus celastroides Sieber ex Schult. & Schult.f. var. celastroides Loranthus tenuiflorus Hook.f. Loranthus maytenifolius A.Gray; Muellerina raoulii (Tiegh.) Tiegh. Loranthus raoulii Tiegh. Amyema maytenifolia (A.Gray) Tiegh. Hookerella tenuiflora (Hook.f.) Tiegh. Phrygilanthus raoulii (Tiegh.) Engl. nom. illeg. Phrygilanthus tenuiflorus (Hook.f.) Engl. nom. illeg.

= Muellerina celastroides =

Species of mistletoe

Muellerina celastroides, common names Banksia mistletoe and coast mistletoe, is a hemiparasitic aerial shrub in the family Loranthaceae. The species is endemic to New South Wales, Victoria and Queensland.

== Description ==
Muellerina celastroides is an erect or spreading plant which is smooth except for the inflorescence axis which is covered with minute, brown, densely matted woolly hairs. The leaves are oblong to elliptic and 2.5–7 cm long and 15–25 mm wide, with a rounded apex and an attenuate base. The inflorescence is a raceme of 1–3 pairs of triads, with the stems of lateral flowers being 3–6 mm long. The calyx is entire and about 1 mm long. The corolla in mature bud is 22–35 mm long. The anthers are about 1.5 mm long, with the free part of filament being 8–13 mm long. The fruit is pear-shaped, 7–11 mm long, and green grading to light red.

== Ecology ==
The most frequently recorded hosts on which M. celastroides grows are Allocasuarina, Banksia, and Eucalyptus species, but it frequently is found on exotics and on other mistletoes. An inventory of host plants for Muellerina celastroides is given by Downey.

Muellerina celastroides hosts the butterflies: Delias nigrina, Delias argenthona, Hypochrysops digglesii, Ogyris abrota, Ogyris zosine and Candelides margarita.

== Taxonomy ==
The species was first described by Franz Sieber in 1829 as Loranthus celastroides. It was redescribed by van Tieghem in 1895 as Muellerina celastroides.
