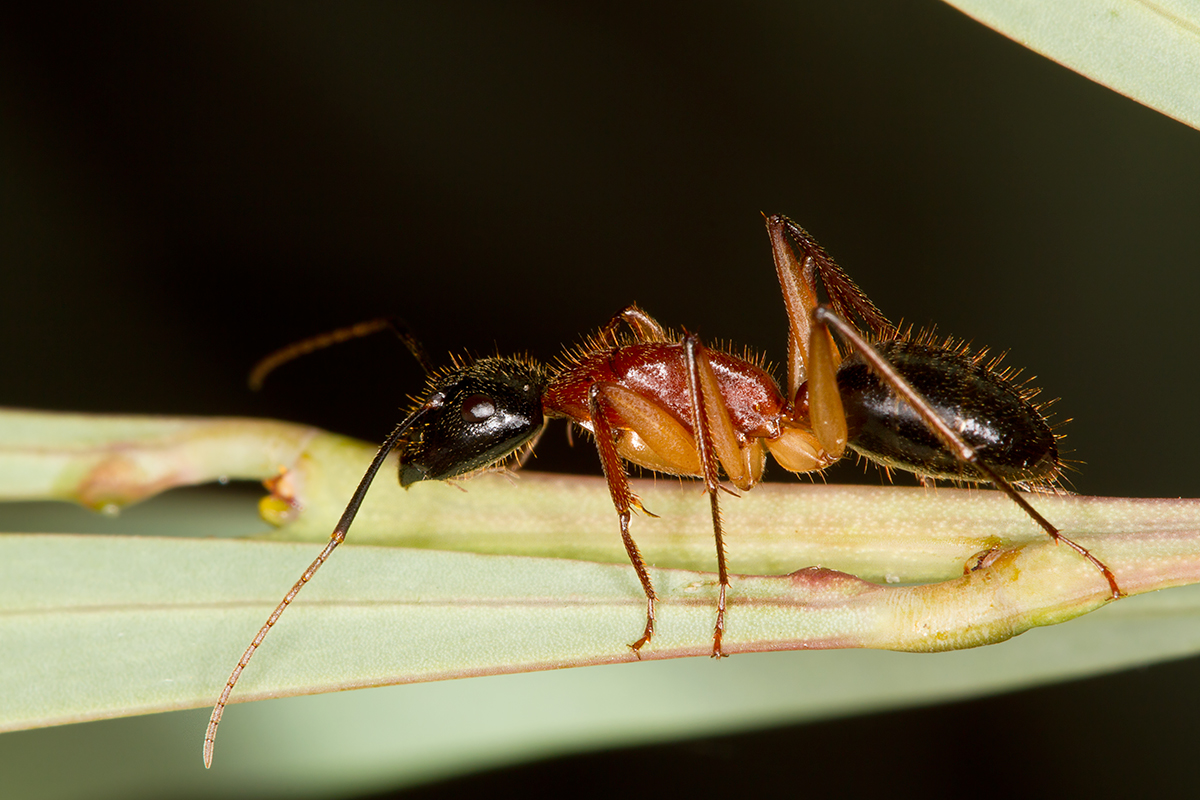
- Black-headed sugar ant worker from Strangways, Victoria

Scientific classification
- Kingdom: Animalia
- Phylum: Arthropoda
- Clade: Pancrustacea
- Class: Insecta
- Order: Hymenoptera
- Family: Formicidae
- Subfamily: Formicinae
- Genus: Camponotus
- Subgenus: Tanaemyrmex
- Species: C. nigriceps

Binomial name
- Camponotus nigriceps (Smith, 1858)

Subspecies
- Camponotus nigriceps lividipes Emery, 1887
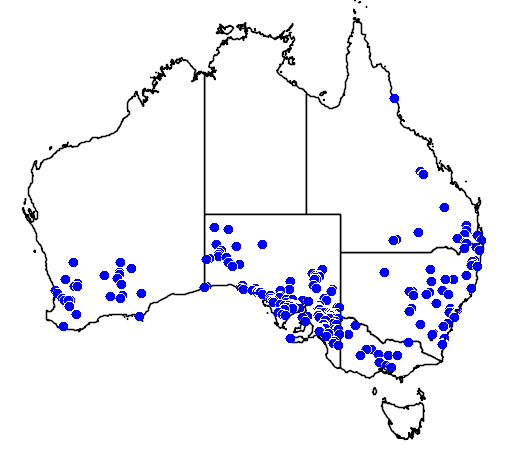
- Occurrences reported to the Atlas of Living Australia as of April 2015

Synonyms
- Formica nigriceps Smith, 1858; Camponotus consobrinus perthianus Wheeler, W.M., 1933; Camponotus nigriceps perthiana McArthur, 1996

= Black-headed sugar ant =

Species of carpenter ant (Camponotus nigriceps)

The black-headed sugar ant (Camponotus nigriceps), also known as the brown sugar ant, is a species of Formicinae ant endemic to Australia. Found throughout most states, the species is a member of the genus Camponotus, a cosmopolitan genus of ants commonly known as carpenter ants. It was formally described and named by British entomologist Frederick Smith in 1858. These ants are characterised by their black head, reddish-brown mesosoma and black gaster, which can change in colour.

The species is polymorphic: workers and soldiers measure 6 to 12 millimetres (0.24 to 0.47 in) and males are 12 millimetres (0.47 in). The queens are the largest members of the colony, measuring 16 millimetres (0.63 in). Colonies dwell in dry regions, including open areas or in dry sclerophyll woodland, where they nest in soil, large mounds or under stones. Nuptial flight occurs in summer and nests can hold several thousand individuals. Considered a household pest, black-headed sugar ants feed on sweet foods and insects and tend to butterfly larvae. Numerous birds and fish prey on these ants.

== Taxonomy ==
The black-headed sugar ant was described from a holotype worker by British entomologist Frederick Smith in his 1858 publication Catalogue of the hymenopterous insects in the collection of the British Museum. Part VI. Formicidae, and was originally placed in the genus Formica. The specific name, nigriceps, is derived from the Latin words niger black", and ceps, abbreviated form of caput "head" when used in a compound word. Some years later, the species was assigned to the genus Camponotus by German entomologist Julius Roger.

In 1887, Italian entomologist Carlo Emery described a subspecies, Camponotus nigriceps lividipes, based on collections of smaller ants. In 1933, William Morton Wheeler classified the black-headed sugar ant as a subspecies of the banded sugar ant (Camponotus consobrinus), but it was later revived as a full species in 1934.

The ant is a member of the Camponotus nigriceps species group, which also includes C. clarior, C. consobrinus, C. dryandrae, C. eastwoodi, C. loweryi, C. longideclivis, C. pallidiceps and C. prostans.

== Description ==
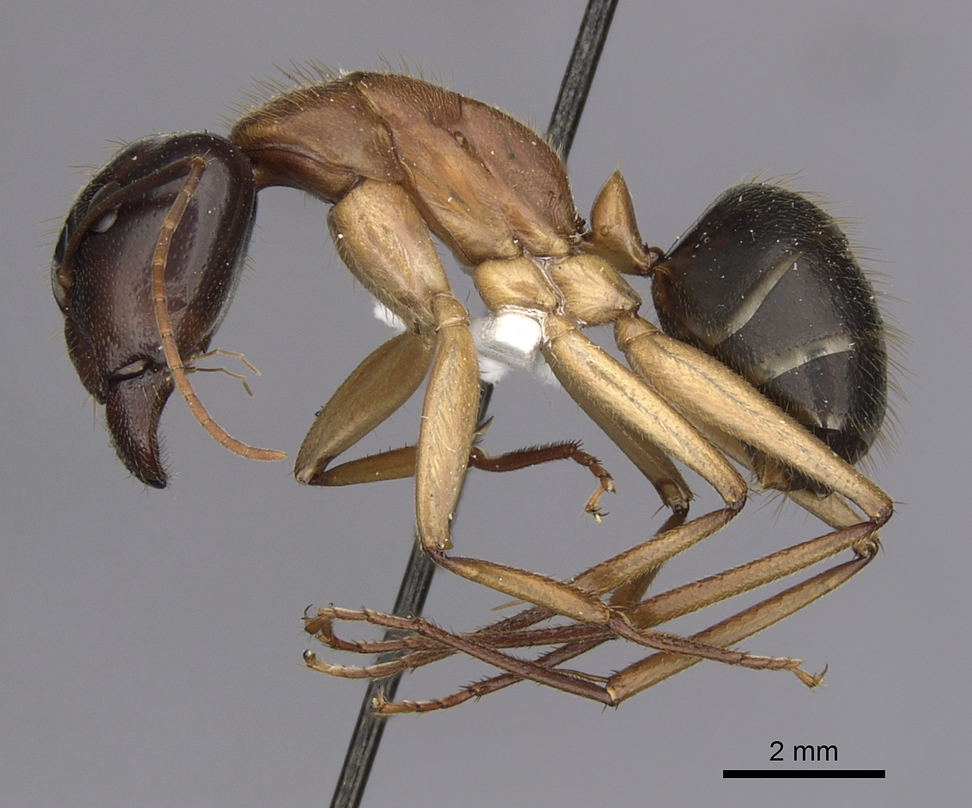
Closeup side view profile of a specimen worker

Ants of this species are relatively large; it is a polymorphic species with two castes of workers, known as minor workers and major workers (soldiers). Workers and soldiers range in sizes from 10 to 12 millimetres (0.39 to 0.47 in). Males measure 12 millimetres (0.47 in) and queens are the largest, measuring 16 millimetres (0.63 in). Workers and soldiers of the subspecies Camponotus nigriceps lividipes only grow to 6 to 10 millimetres (0.24 to 0.39 in). Workers' gasters and mesosomi can vary in colour; the gaster can be black, brown or yellowish-brown while the mesosoma is either reddish-brown or yellow. Workers are mostly brown with light patches noticeable on the head and mesosoma, and their clypei and mandibles are even darker; the legs are either black or brown.

A large number of hairs grow from the gaster, mesonotum, pronotum and propodeum. On average, individual hairs are 0.35 millimetres (0.01 in) long. Golden, erect setae are present under the head and on the mesosoma. The setae on the tibia are short in comparison to setae on the mesosoma. The workers' eyes bulge while soldiers' eyes are flat. Within the Camponotus nigriceps species group, the black-headed sugar ant can be easily mistaken for a banded sugar ant due to its similar appearance, but the latter are darker and have a band wrapping around their gaster, a feature absent on the black-headed sugar ant. Minor worker specimens are usually examined when trying to identify similar-looking species.

== Distribution and habitat ==
The black-headed sugar ant can be found in most Australian states. The species is restricted to the north and south-east of Queensland, and is widespread throughout the Australian Capital Territory. The ant is also widespread throughout New South Wales and Victoria, but it is not found in the north-west of New South Wales and south-east of Victoria. In South Australia, it is commonly seen in the south-eastern regions and less encountered in the north-west. Populations are present in Western Australia, but they are not found in either the north regions of the state or in the Northern Territory. (Note: The CSIRO Division of Entomology claims the ant is only distributed in New South Wales.)

Black-headed sugar ants mostly live in dry regions including dry sclerophyll woodland or open areas, particularly in pastures. Other preferred habitats include mallee, eucalyptus woodland and Casuarina cristata woodland, at elevations ranging 241–319 metres (791–1,047 ft). Nests are found in laterite soil in upland areas, surrounded by tall eucalyptus trees or under groves. Nests can also be found in large mounds or under stones. Sometimes, cedar wood and large mounds occupied by the meat ant (Iridomyrmex purpureus) are inhabited by black-headed sugar ants.

== Behaviour and ecology ==
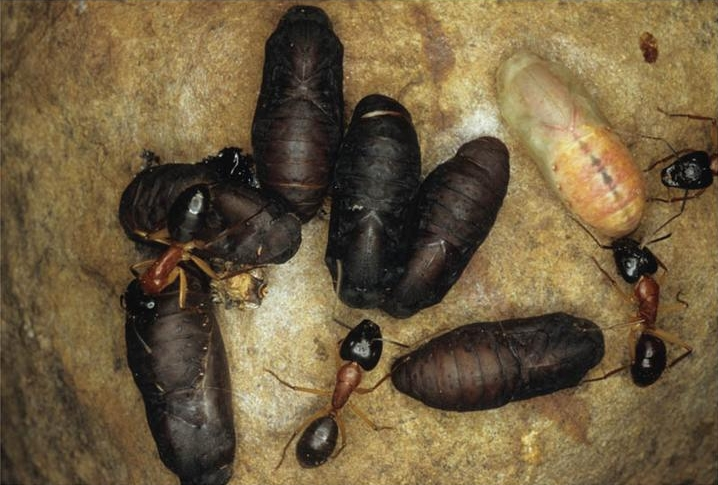
Major workers attending to Ogyris genoveva pupae

Black-headed sugar ants are nocturnal foragers of food. The species is sometimes considered a household pest since ants can enter human homes at night in search of food. During the day, these ants are not active and have exhibited sleep-like behaviours until it is night. The black-headed sugar ant predominantly feeds on sweet secretions and sugar water; insects and a variety of foodstuffs in human homes are also consumed.

Workers use several social techniques during colony movements to other nest sites or to lead others to food sources, which includes a worker carrying another worker, tandem running or laying down a pheromone trail for orientation. They are also attendants to the butterflies Ogyris idmo and Ogyris genoveva. The larvae will reside in underground areas constructed by attending ants, and during the night they will emerge with them and feed on mistletoe leaves. The species is tolerant to myrmecophiles; the beetles Ctenisophus morosus and Cryptodus paradoxus have been found in nests, and the wingless cricket Myrmecophilus australis also dwells inside colonies. Other insects which dwell inside nests include froghoppers in the family Cercopidae.

Several birds and other predatory organisms prey on the black-headed sugar ant. Birds such as the black-faced woodswallow, rufous treecreeper, noisy miner, jacky winter and southern scrub robin prey on this species, as indicated by the fact that workers body parts have been found in the birds' stomach contents. Other predators of the black-headed sugar ant include the rainbow trout.

Nuptial flight most likely begins during summer, as a young mated queen with no brood was found in a freshly built chamber in January. During the early years of colony foundation, there are more soldiers, and older colonies may have a workforce consisting only of minor workers. A typical colony may contain five to seven thousand individuals. Queens of the species can live for an exceptionally long time; wild queens can live for up to 21 years with one known captive living to 23 years of age, making it the second oldest recorded ant queen. Larvae of this species can grow to be quite large; collected larvae reach lengths of 16.4 millimetres (0.65 in).

== See also ==
- List of Camponotus species
- List of ants of Australia
