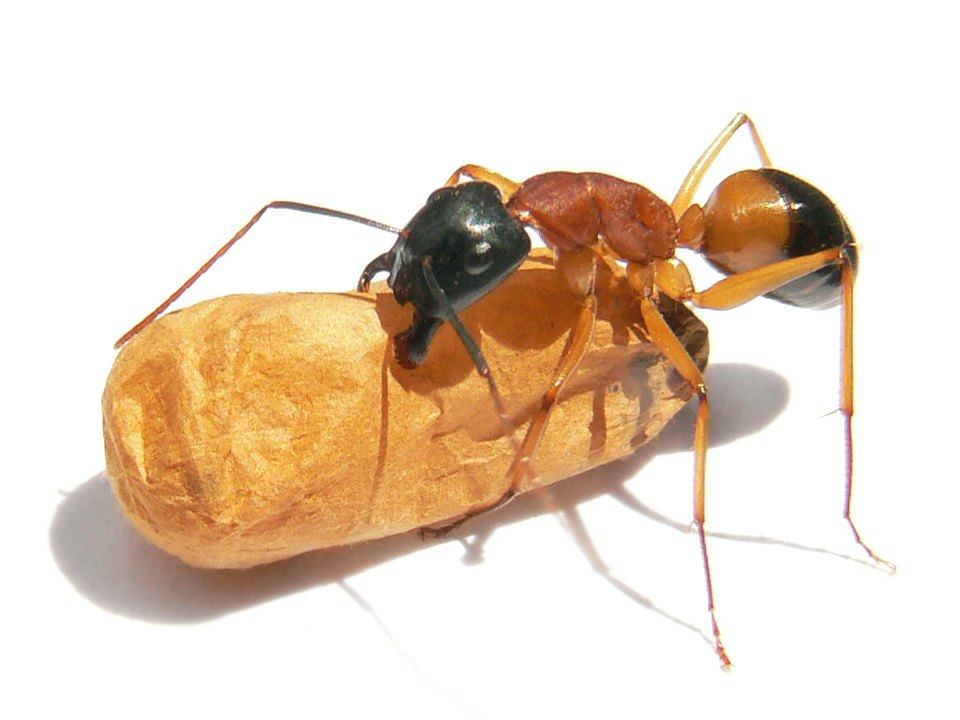
- Worker with cocoon

Scientific classification
- Kingdom: Animalia
- Phylum: Arthropoda
- Clade: Pancrustacea
- Class: Insecta
- Order: Hymenoptera
- Family: Formicidae
- Subfamily: Formicinae
- Genus: Camponotus
- Subgenus: Tanaemyrmex
- Species: C. consobrinus

Binomial name
- Camponotus consobrinus (Erichson, 1842)
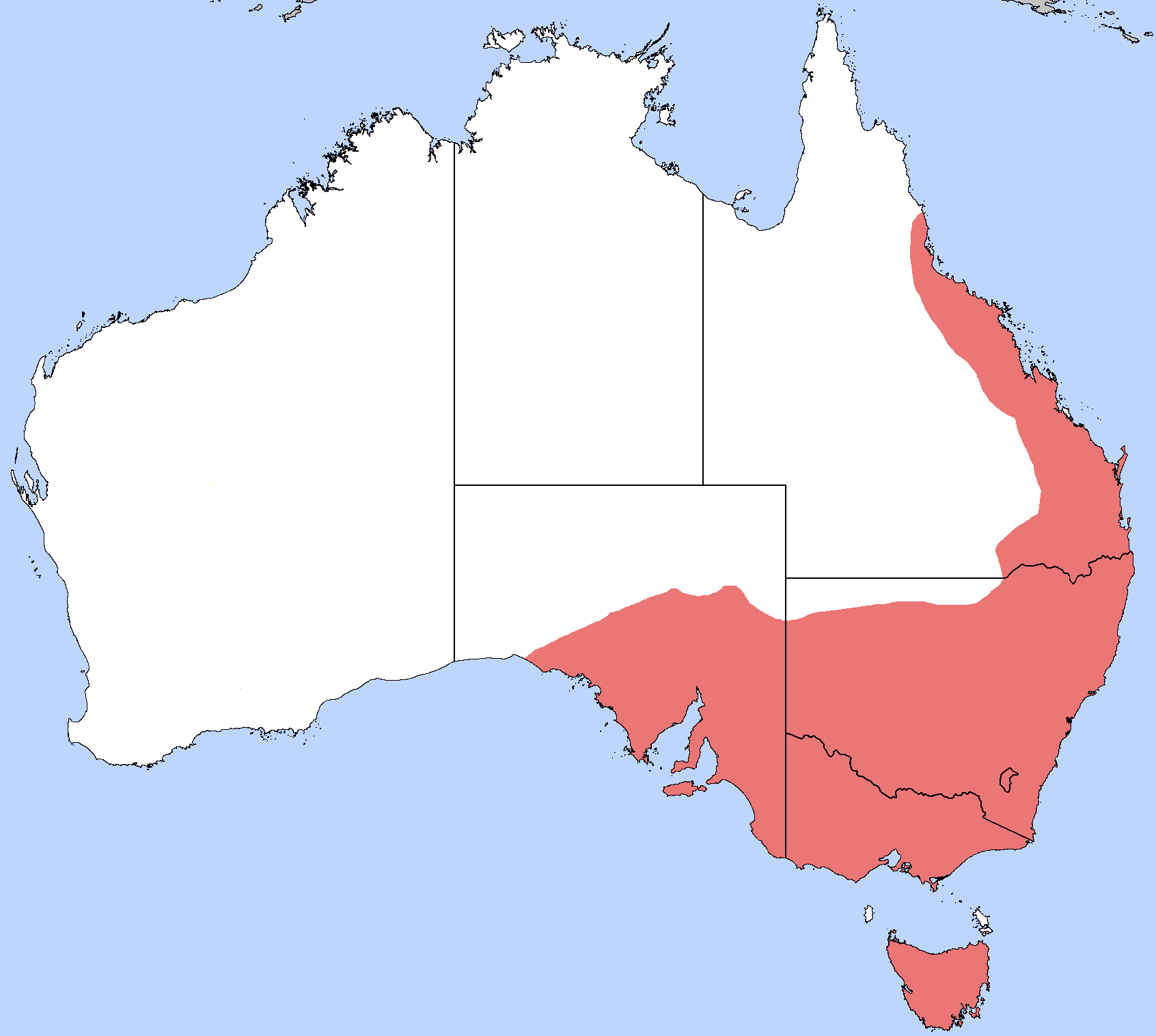
- Distribution of the banded sugar ant

Synonyms
- Camponotus dimidiatus Roger, 1863; Camponotus nigriceps obniger Forel, 1902; Formica consobrina Erichson, 1842

= Banded sugar ant =

Species of carpenter ant (Camponotus consobrinus)

The banded sugar ant (Camponotus consobrinus), also known as the sugar ant, is a species of ant native to Australia. A member of the genus Camponotus in the subfamily Formicinae, it was described by German entomologist Wilhelm Ferdinand Erichson in 1842. Its common name refers to the ant's liking for sugar and sweet food, as well as the distinctive orange-brown band that wraps around its gaster.

The ant is polymorphic and relatively large, with two different castes of workers: major workers (also known as soldiers), and minor workers. These two group of workers measure around 5 to 15 millimetres (0.2 to 0.6 in) in length, while the queen ants are even larger. Mainly nocturnal, banded sugar ants prefer a mesic habitat, and are commonly found in forests and woodlands. They also occur in urban areas, where they are considered a household pest. The ant's diet includes sweet secretions that are retrieved from aphids and other insects that it tends. This species is a competitor of the meat ant (Iridomyrmex purpureus); food robbery and nest-plugging are known to occur between these two ants. Workers prey on insects, killing them with a spray of formic acid. Banded sugar ants are preyed upon by other ants, echidnas, and birds. The eggs of this species were consumed by Indigenous Australians.

== Taxonomy ==
The banded sugar ant was first described by German entomologist Wilhelm Ferdinand Erichson, who named it Formica consobrina in 1842. The holotype specimen is a queen collected from Tasmania, which is now housed in the Museum für Naturkunde in Berlin. Formica consobrina was later moved to the genus Camponotus as Camponotus consobrinus, by entomologist Julius Roger in 1863. In 1933, American entomologist William Morton Wheeler described some subspecies and variants of the banded sugar ant. These subspecies were C. consobrinus lividipes and C. consobrinus nigriceps, while the variants were C. consobrinus var. obniger and C. consobrinus var. perthianus. Some of these classifications were short-lived; C. consobrinus nigriceps was later revived as a full species in 1934 as C. nigriceps, while C. consobrinus lividipes was synonymised with C. consobrinus. C. consobrinus lividipes was treated as a subspecies for C. nigriceps in 1985, now known as C. nigriceps lividipes. In 1996 C. consobrinus perthianus was synonymised with C. nigriceps, and C. consobrinus var. obniger was synonymised with C. consobrinus.

The specific name is derived from the Latin word consobrina, meaning "cousin". This is in reference to its similar appearance with the species C. herculeanus.

The ant is a member of the Camponotus nigriceps species group, which also includes C. clarior, C. dryandrae, C. eastwoodi, C. loweryi, C. longideclivis, C. nigriceps, C. pallidiceps and C. prostans. The species is commonly known as the banded sugar ant or sugar ant due to its attraction to sweet food and the orange-brown band that is present on its gaster.

== Description ==
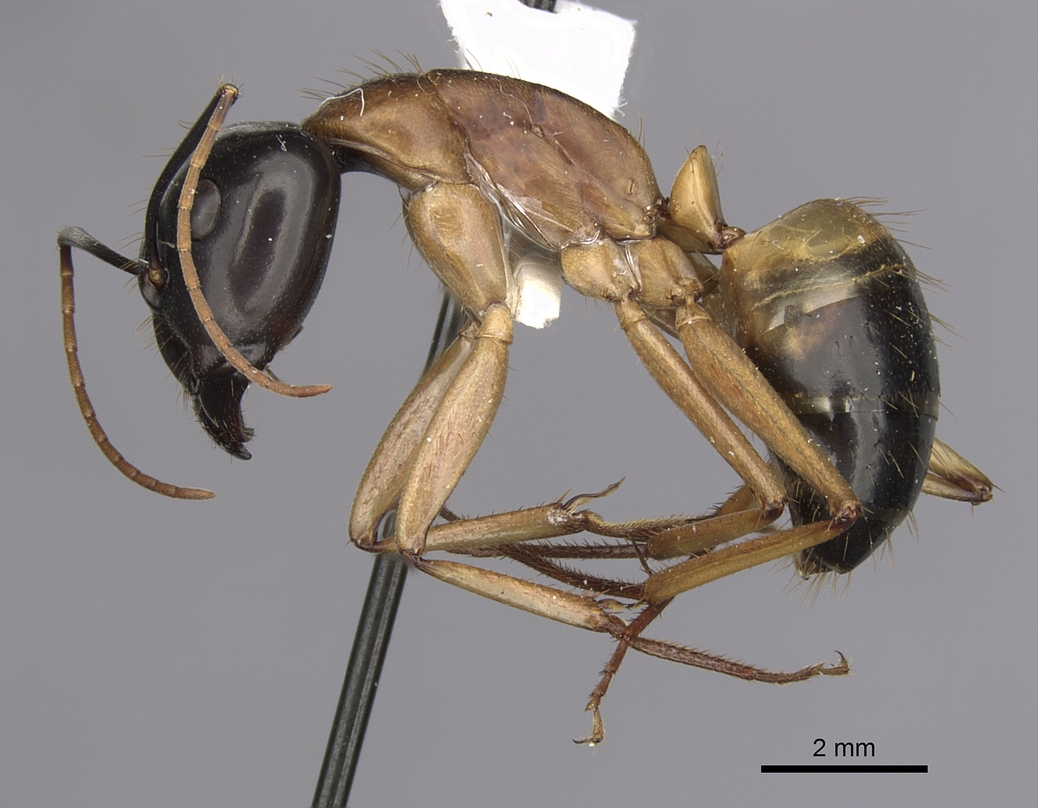
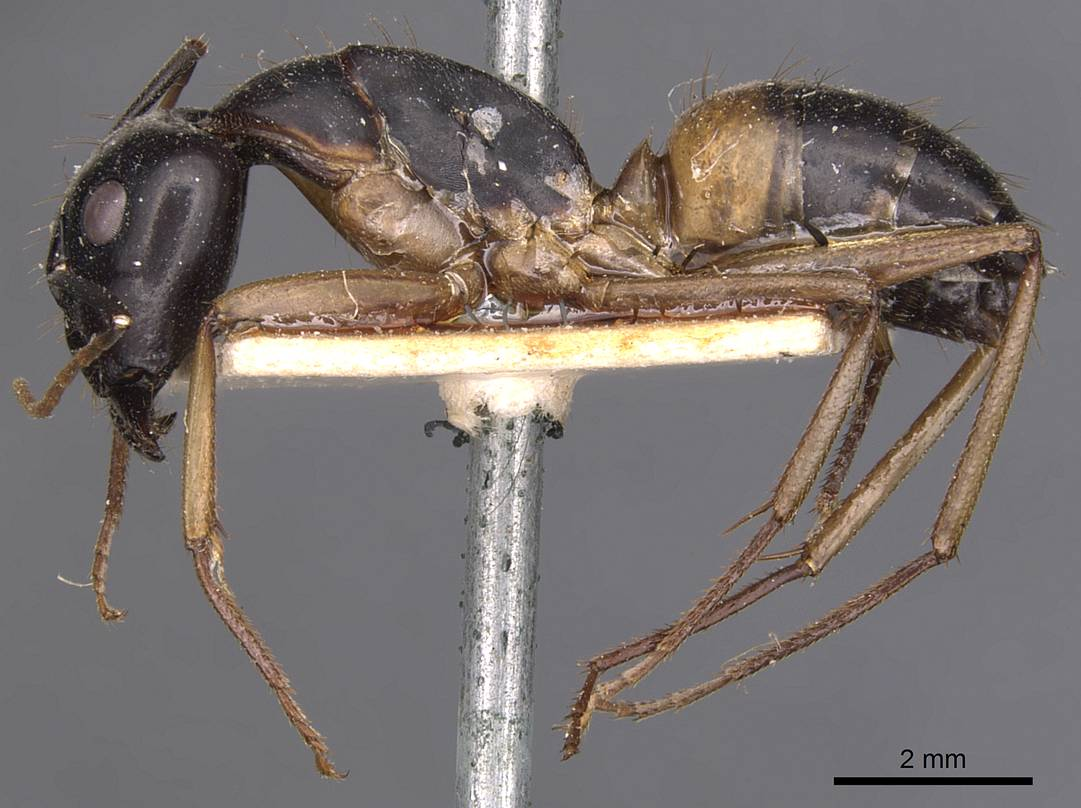
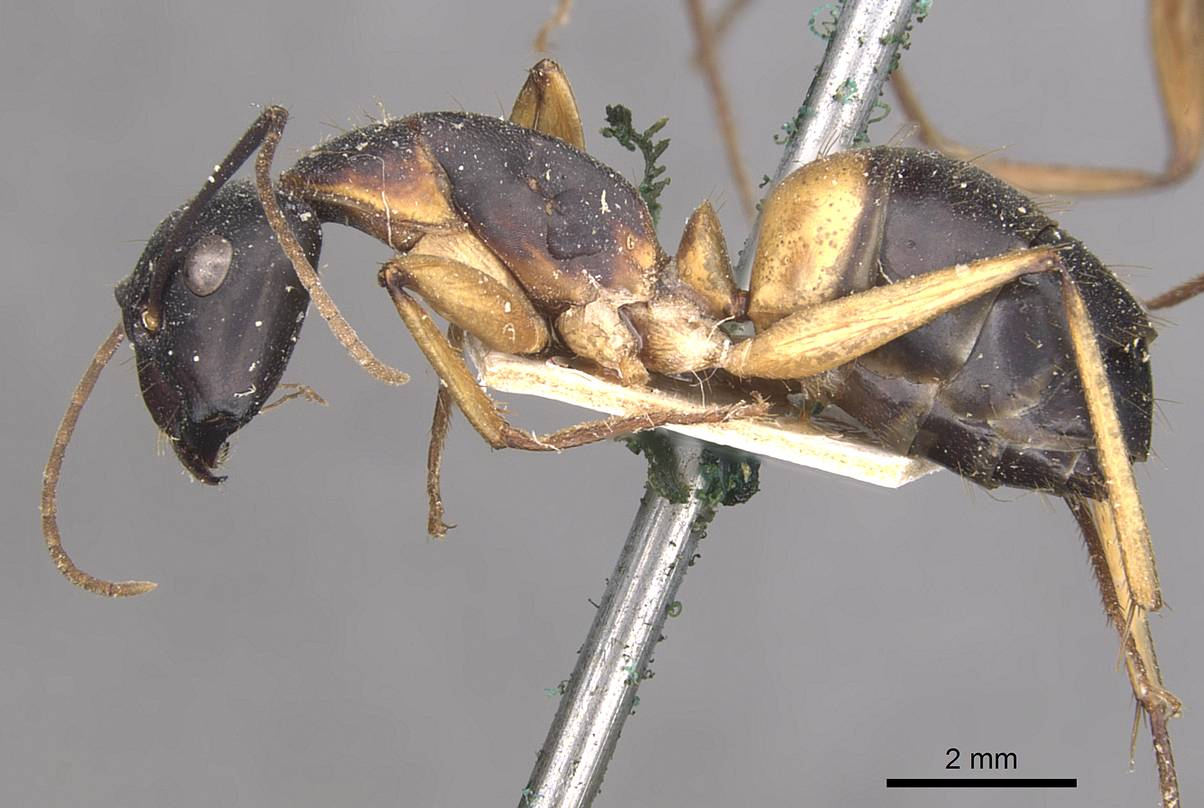
Worker specimens. Banded sugar ants come in a variety of colours as shown. There is a distinctive orange-brown band around their gasters.

Banded sugar ants appear in different forms, varying from 4 to 16 millimetres (0.2 to 0.6 in) in length, making them a large species. Banded sugar ants are polymorphic, and colonies have two types of workers: minor workers and major workers that have different size ranges. The two castes can be identified easily, due to the workers being smaller and more slender, while the soldiers are larger and more robust. Both castes carry a set of powerful mandibles. Queen ants are the largest ants in the colony. Banded sugar ants come in a large variety of colours, possibly due to ecological rather than genetic influences. For example, humidity, insolation and temperature may all affect the colour of an individual.

Female banded sugar ants are easily recognised by their black head, orange thorax and the orange-brown band that wraps around their gaster. Males of the species are completely black. The dark sides of the thorax and legs are ferruginous (rusty in colour). The scape (the base of the antenna) and mandibles are black, and the head is wider than the thorax. The thorax is longer than its total width and slightly compressed, and the gaster is covered with tiny black dots. Erect setae are golden in colour and absent under the head but present on the mesosoma. The setae on the tibia and scape are shorter than those on the mesosoma. The anterior of the gaster is lighter in colour compared to the posterior, and the dorsum of the mesosoma is outlined and curved. A worker's metanotum is absent and the eyes are bulging, while a soldier's metanotum is noticeable and the eyes are flat. The wings on the queen are dark, and the stigmata and nerves are yellow. While many ant species have a metapleural gland, the gland is not present in the banded sugar ant; the number of malpighian tubules in workers is 21.

The related black-headed sugar ant (Camponotus nigriceps) has a similar appearance and may be mistaken for a banded sugar ant. Black-headed sugar ants are lighter in colour than banded sugar ants and the orange-brown band is absent from their gaster.

== Distribution and habitat ==
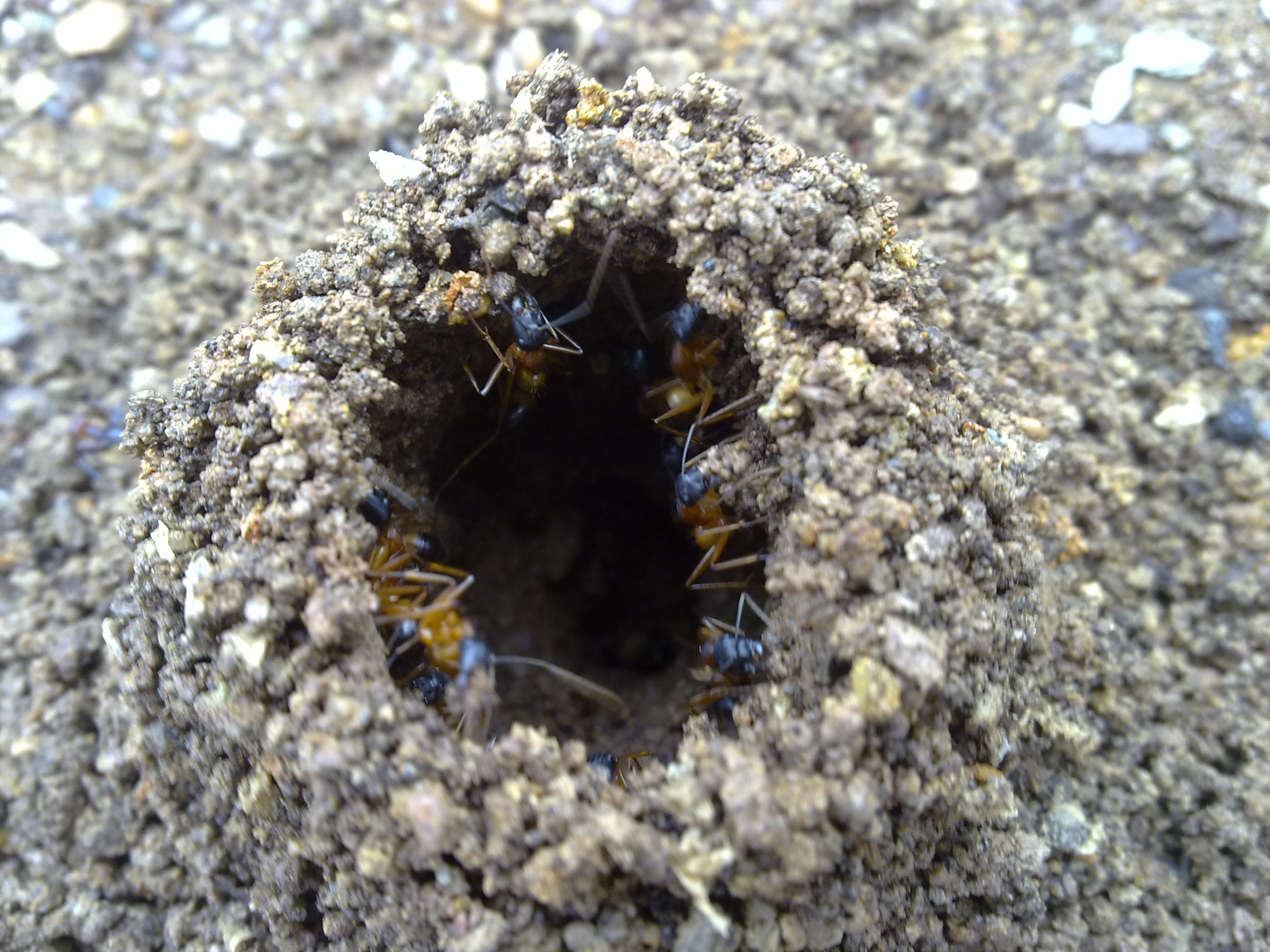
Banded sugar ants rebuild their nest entrance following rain

The banded sugar ant is one of the most widely distributed ants in Australia, but is most commonly found in south-east Australia. It occurs along the north-east coast of Queensland, from Charters Towers in the north to Brisbane in the south. The ant is widespread in New South Wales, the Australian Capital Territory, Victoria and Tasmania. In South Australia, it is a common household pest in Adelaide, and populations are mostly found in the south-east of the state while the species is absent in the north-west. The banded sugar ant's presence in Western Australia has yet to be verified. These ants are found in urban areas, eucalypt forests, dry sclerophyll woodland, grasslands and heaths, preferring a mesic habitat. In the drier regions of Australia, the banded sugar ant is absent and is usually replaced by Camponotus nigriceps. Banded sugar ants have been recorded from elevations ranging from 170 to 853 metres (558 to 2,800 ft).

Nests are found in a variety of sites, including holes in wood, roots of plants, twigs of trees and shrubs, between rocks, in the soil, and under paving stones. Sometimes, banded sugar ant colonies form small mounds, which are less than 20 cm (7.9 in) in diameter and usually funnel-shaped and ephemeral. Mounds are not constructed in undisturbed regions where land degradation has not occurred. Instead, the entrance of a nest consists of a smooth-walled vertical shaft that is 15 to 17 millimetres (0.59 to 0.67 in) in diameter. Chambers in the nest have a similar appearance to the nest entrance (shaft-like walls), and the floors within the chambers are typically 20 to 30 millimetres (0.8 to 1.2 in) in length with an arched roof that is 10 millimetres (0.4 in) in height. Excavated meat ant nests show that banded sugar ants will also inhabit them.

== Behaviour and ecology ==
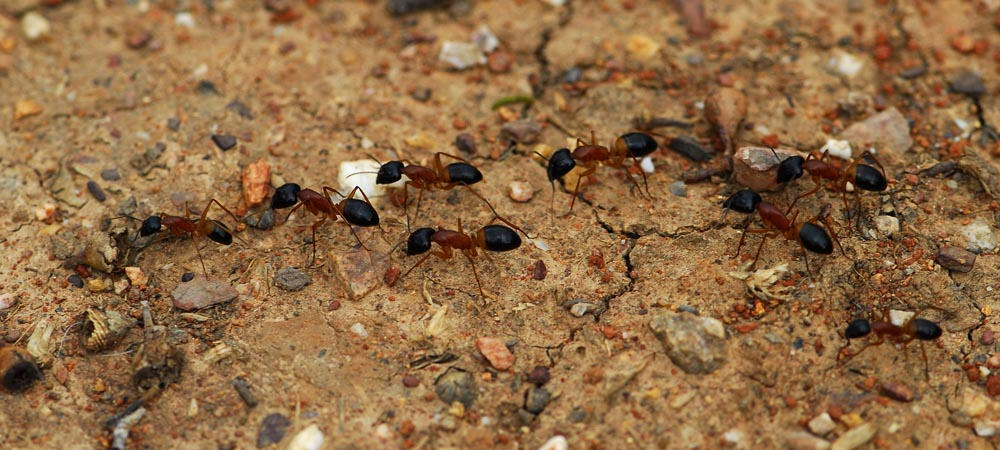
Workers recruit additional nestmates to exploit newly discovered food sources by the method of tandem running. The lead worker (on the left) has returned to the nest and is leading the remaining workers back to the food source.

Banded sugar ants are the dominant group of nocturnal ants in their range. Workers are mostly encountered at dusk when they are foraging for food on marked trails or on Casuarina and Eucalyptus trees. These ants also forage during the day, but they are more frequently seen at night. They are also more active during the warmer seasons, especially summer. Banded sugar ants use multiple social techniques to make other ants follow them to a food source; this includes a worker carrying another worker, tandem running, or simply leaving a pheromone trail to the source. Around 2–35% of foraging workers engage in tandem running.

Banded sugar ants will often attack the nests of other ant species at random, while ignoring other ants nearby. They use their mandibles to hold opponents, and use formic acid to kill them. Foraging workers use visual cues to help them find their way around, or to let them determine that they are lost; workers will identify landmarks they are familiar with to orientate themselves. When provoked, an individual banded sugar ant will lift up its abdomen and use its large mandibles to fend off an attacker. If further provoked, it can defend itself by spraying formic acid from its abdomen to deter predators.

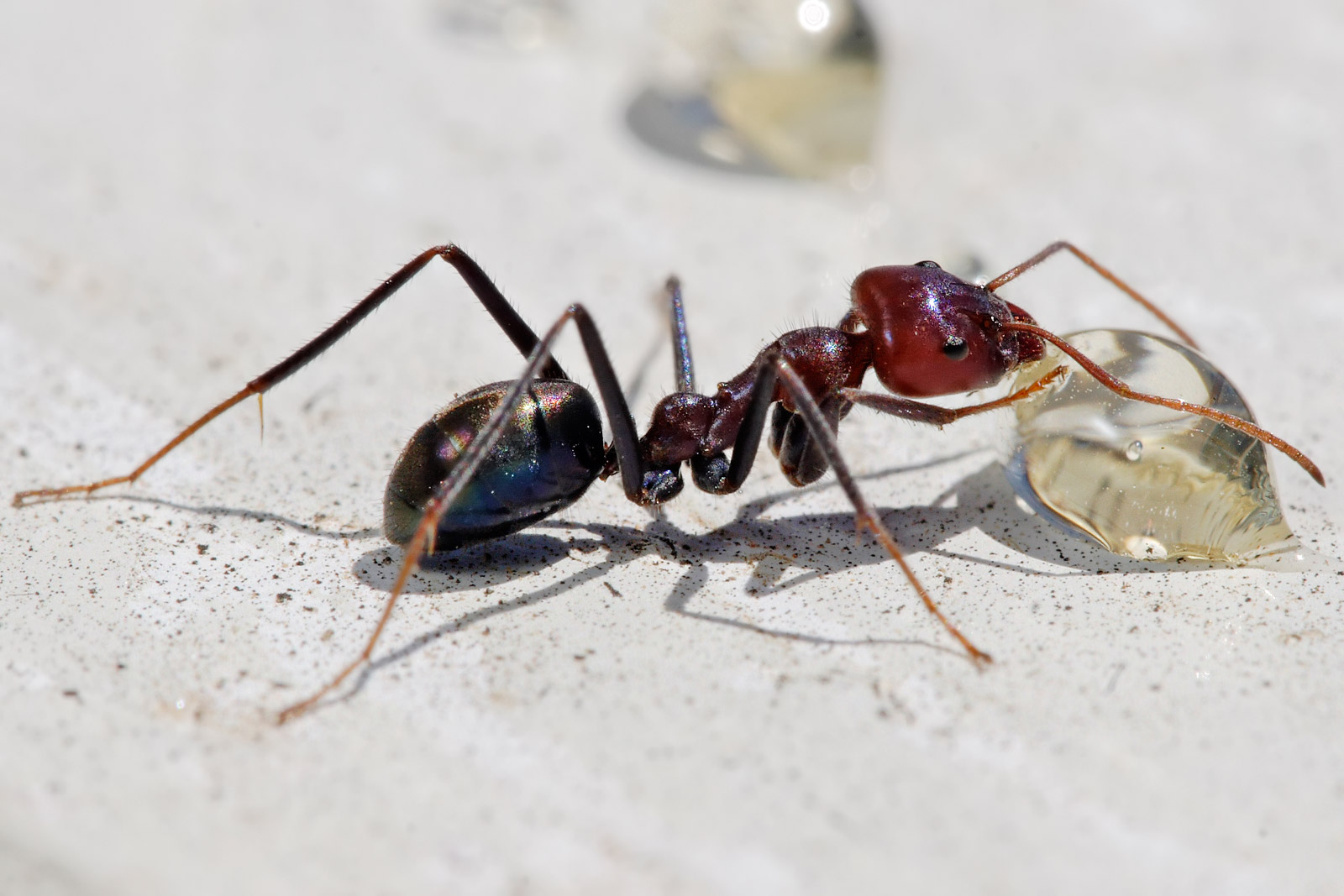
The meat ant, a known competitor of the banded sugar ant

A common competitor of sugar ants are meat ants, which have been observed blocking banded sugar ant nesting holes with pebbles and soil to prevent them from leaving their nest during the early hours of the day. The ants counter this by preventing meat ants from leaving their nest by blocking their nesting holes with debris, a behaviour known as nest-plugging. If meat ant nests are encroached by trees or other shade, banded sugar ants may invade and take over the nest, since the health of the colony may deteriorate from overshadowing. Members of an affected meat ant colony later move to a nearby satellite nest that is placed in a suitable area, while invading banded sugar ants fill nest galleries up with a black resinous material. In a 1999 study, Pogonoscopus myrmex leafhoppers were placed in a banded sugar ant colony to test the reaction of non-host ants. These leafhoppers were attacked, suggesting no symbiotic relationship between the two.

Starlings have been observed to rub banded sugar ants on their feathers and skin, a behaviour known as anting.

=== Diet and predators ===
Banded sugar ants are omnivores and feed on sweet substances. They tend plant-eating insects such as aphids, and feed on the fluids they secrete. Honeydew secretions are produced from the anus of the aphid, which is later provided to the ants. This behaviour is mutually beneficial to both organisms, as the ants protect the aphids from predation and the aphids provides a nutritious liquid to the ants. Banded sugar ants also tend the larvae of the southern purple azure butterfly (Ogyris genoveva). They are visitors to flowers of Eucalyptus globulus trees, where they can act as pollinators. They may be seen at night foraging under lights in urban areas for arthropod prey, such as termites and the southern cattle tick (Rhipicephalus microplus). During the night, banded sugar ants are known to "rob" food sources excreted by Hemiptera insects that are fed on by meat ants during the day. Banded sugar ants and meat ants tend to nest near one another, and areas where the two ants forage have shorter foraging periods due to interference between the species. Banded sugar ants are nocturnal while meat ants are not, so foraging periods are extended by one or two hours if no interference occurs.

Banded sugar ants have been found in the feces of the short-beaked echidna (Tachyglossus aculeatus), and non-passerine birds are known to predate them. The blackish blindsnake (Ramphotyphlops nigrescens) follows trails laid by banded sugar ants, possibly to locate them as potential prey. Blindsnakes are also known to consume the brood of this species. The Australian ant-slayer spider, Euryopis umbilicata, is a specialist predator of this species, with one study finding 90.6% of the spider's prey to be C. consobrinus. Nematodes are a parasite to banded sugar ant larvae, as several mermithergate larvae were described. Infected individuals are recognisable by their swollen gasters; for example, uninfected ants measuring 13 to 14 millimetres (0.51 to 0.55 in) in length have a gaster length of 4 to 5 millimetres (0.16 to 0.20 in) while the gaster of infected individuals who are similar in size is 6 to 7 millimetres (0.24 to 0.28 in). Some specimens collected had gasters so swollen that the intersegmental-membrane was exposed.

=== Life cycle and reproduction ===
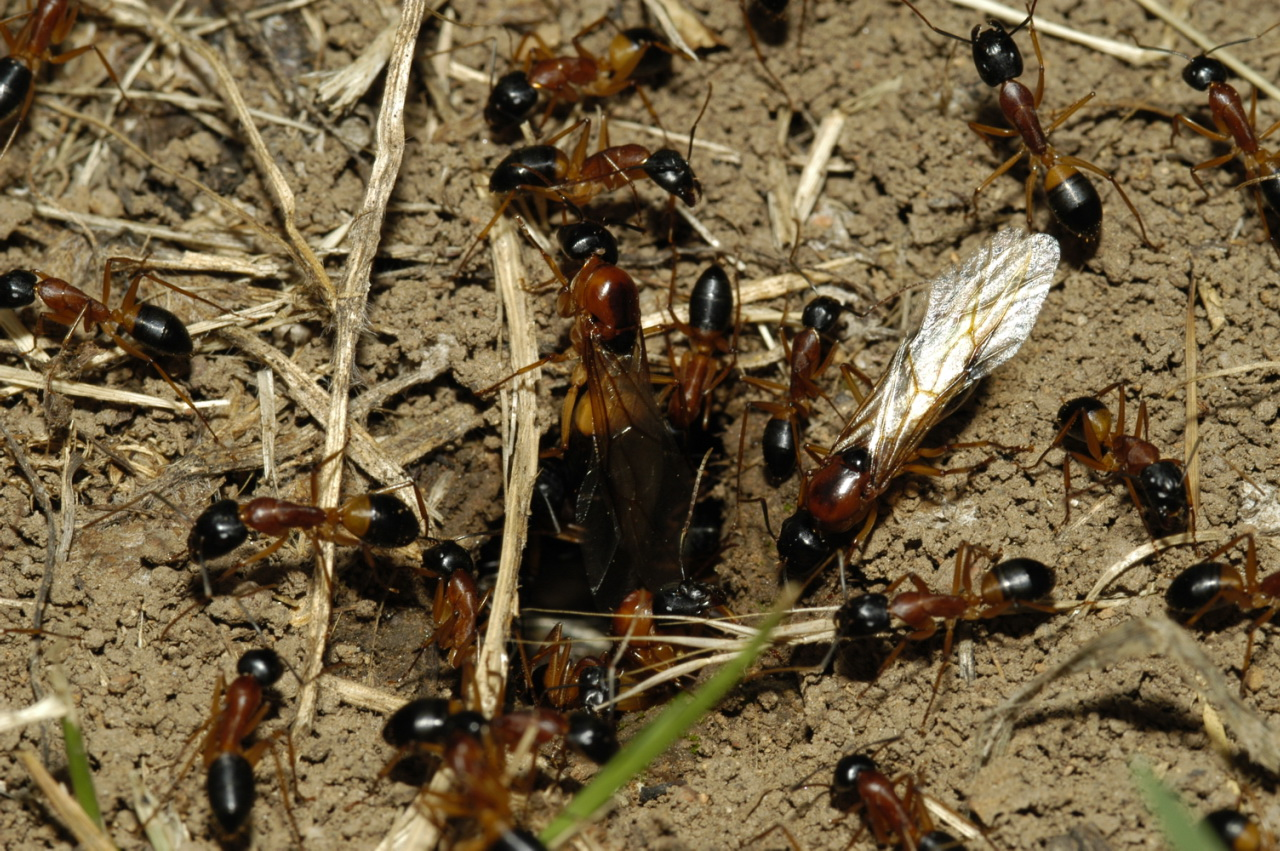
Queens exiting a nest for nuptial flight

Like all ants, banded sugar ants begin life as eggs. If the egg is fertilised, the ant becomes a female; if not, it will become a male. They develop through complete metamorphosis, meaning that they pass through a larval and pupal stage before emerging as adults.

Although most banded sugar ant colonies are monogynous (a nest that contains a single queen), some have been found to be polygynous, where a colony will have multiple queens; this is the fourth Camponotus species that is recognized as exhibiting polygyny. In polygynous colonies, queens are not territorial and free-mixing of offspring is observed. Despite the homogeneous environmental factors, different family lineages are strongly correlated with ant caste, suggesting caste is largely genetically determined. Nests containing a single queen are monandrous, where a queen will only mate once with a male. Not much is known about their nuptial flight, although virgin queens and males (alates) were observed mating in South Australia in January; and in early December in Southeast Queensland (2017). This hints that banded sugar ants will mate during mid-summer, and colony foundation occurs at this time. Ideal conditions for nuptial flight is on warm days during the afternoon at temperatures of 20–25 °C (68–77 °F), which is when the alates begin to swarm. A colony can be long-lived, with queens living for seven years or more. The black carpenter ant (Camponotus pennsylvanicus) is known to adopt larvae and pupae from banded sugar ant colonies.

Workers that belong to different matrilines (female ancestry) appear significantly different from each other in size. Matrilines are also said to influence caste determination within the species.

== Interaction with humans ==
The banded sugar ant is considered a household pest and is occasionally seen in houses at night. It is capable of damaging furniture and fittings by chewing the wood. Carbon disulphide can be used to treat and remove a banded sugar ant nest. The ants do not pose any threat to humans, because they are incapable of stinging and can only spray formic acid. However, the larger soldiers can inflict a painful bite with their powerful jaws, and the formic acid they spray is corrosive to human skin. The eggs of the species were consumed by Indigenous Australians.

== See also ==
- List of ants of Australia
- List of Camponotus species
