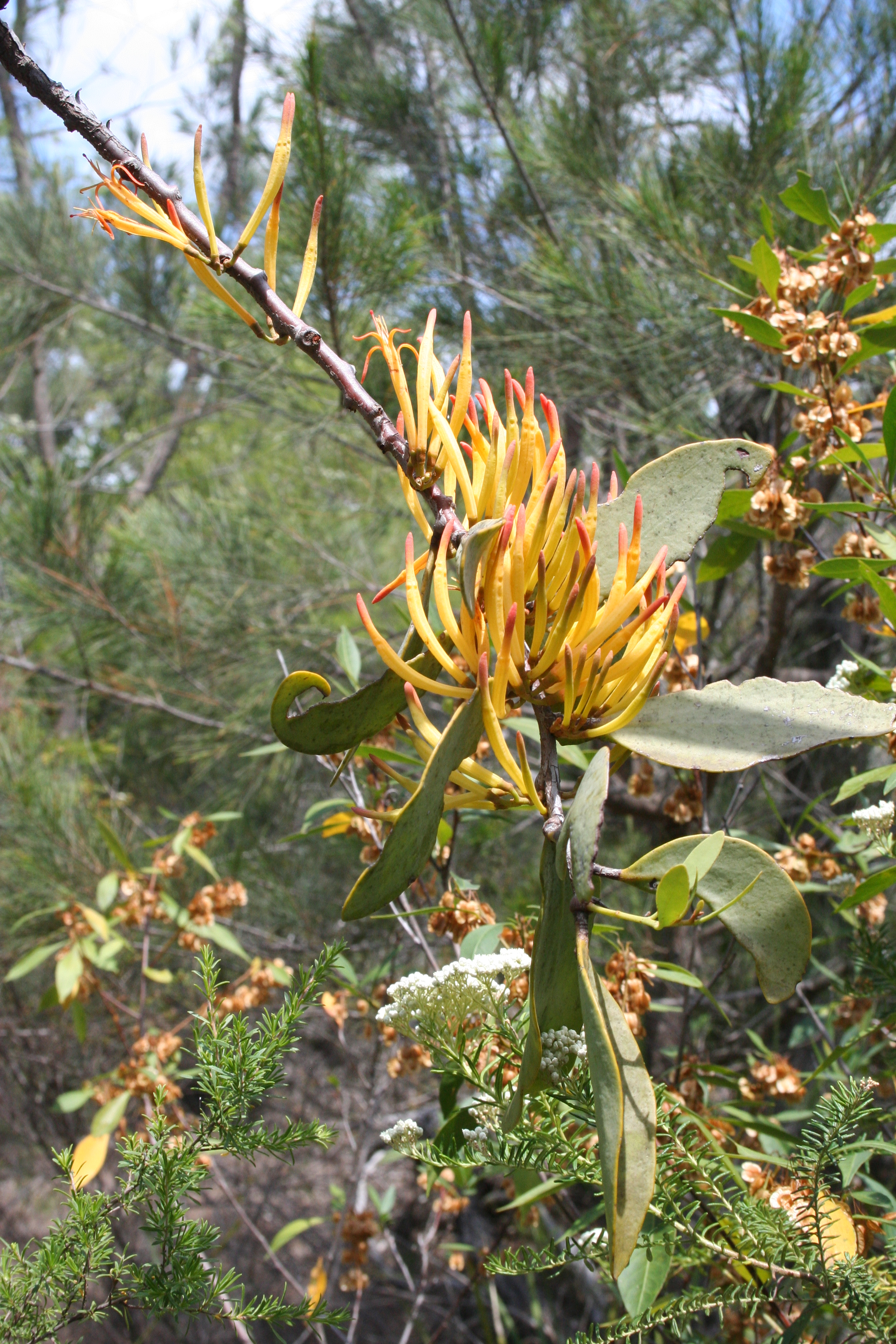

Scientific classification
- Kingdom: Plantae
- Clade: Tracheophytes
- Clade: Angiosperms
- Clade: Eudicots
- Order: Santalales
- Family: Loranthaceae
- Genus: Dendrophthoe
- Species: D. vitellina

Binomial name
- Dendrophthoe vitellina (F.Muell.) Tiegh.

Synonyms
- Loranthus vitellinus F. Muell.

= Dendrophthoe vitellina =

Species of mistletoe

Dendrophthoe vitellina, commonly known as long-flowered- or apostle mistletoe, is a hemiparasitic plant of the mistletoe family Loranthaceae. The genus Dendrophthoe comprises about 31 species spread across tropical Africa, Asia, and Australia. Despite being collected by Joseph Banks and Daniel Solander in 1788, and depicted in Banks' Florilegium, it was not until 1860 that it was described by Ferdinand von Mueller as Loranthus vitellinus after being collected near Ipswich, and renamed by Philippe Édouard Léon Van Tieghem in 1895.

== Description ==
It grows as shrubby plant, with either a spreading or pendent (drooping) habit, from a tree branch or trunk. It has external roots, and hairy new growth maturing to smooth branches and foliage. The leaves are spear- or oval-shaped with a blunt apex, and measure 4–16 cm (1.5–6.5 in) long and 0.6–3 cm (0.24–1.18 in) wide. The inflorescences are composed of 5 to 20 smaller flowers. The flowers are generally yellow or orange with red tips, though some northern populations have redder flowers. They are covered in a fine fur. Flowering is followed by the development of an egg-shaped fruit 1–1.5 cm (0.39–0.59 in) long and red to yellow in colour, which contains a single seed in a sticky coating.

The similar-looking smooth-flowered mistletoe (D. glabrescens) has smooth flowers and leaves broader than 3 cm (1 in) in width, and is found west of the Great Dividing Range.

== Distribution and habitat ==
The range is from far north Queensland along the east coast of Australia through New South Wales and into Victoria. In northern New South Wales, it extends inland to the Nandewar Range In Victoria it occurs to the east of Genoa in East Gippsland. It generally grows on trees of the family Myrtaceae in open sclerophyll forest, but also on Eucalyptus grandis in forest on the fringes of rainforest.

== Ecology ==
At least 66 native plant species from 16 families (predominantly the genera Eucalyptus, Angophora and Melaleuca) have been recorded as host plants for Dendrophthoe vitellina, and in addition, a number of exotic species also. It has been recorded on an exotic plane tree, Platanus × hispanica. Growing on a small red bloodwood (Corymbia gummifera) is hazardous for the host species.

Dendrophthoe vitellina is the main host plant for caterpillars of the marbled line blue butterfly (Erysichton palmyra), while caterpillars of other butterfly species the black jezebel (Delias nigrina), red-banded jezebel (D. mysis), narcissus jewel (Hypochrysops narcissus), silky jewel (H. digglesii), dull oakblue (Arhopala centaurus), black-spotted flash (Hypolycaena phorbas), trident pencil-blue (Candalides margarita), dark purple azure (Ogyris abrota), golden azure (O. ianthis), orange-tipped azure (O. iphis), sapphire azure (O. aenone), southern purple azure (O. genoveva) and northern purple azure (O. zosine) also eat the plant. The fleshy fruit is consumed by the brushtail possum (Trichosurus vulpecula).

The seed immediately begins to germinate and soon penetrates the vascular system of the tree and creates a physiological connection with the Xylem of the new host. From that point, the seedling begins to obtain water and mineral nutrients from the host.
