= Nigel R. Franks =

British ethologist

Nigel R. Franks (born 21 August 1956) is an English emeritus professor of Animal Behaviour and Ecology at the University of Bristol, a renowned specialist in studies of collective animal behavior, especially of ant colonies.

== Career ==
He obtained a BSc and PhD in biology at the University of Leeds. After receiving his BSc in 1977 he began his PhD, during which he spent two years doing field work in Panama on army ants with the Smithsonian Tropical Research Institute. He was awarded the Thomas Henry Huxley Award in 1980 from the Zoological Society of London for the best British PhD in Zoology. He then received a Postdoctoral Fellowship from the Royal Commission for the Great Exhibition of 1851 allowing him to undertake postdoctoral work under Edward O. Wilson at Harvard University before becoming a lecturer at the University of Bath in 1982, later being promoted to full professor in 1995. He moved to the University of Bristol in 2001.

Franks is renowned for his studies of collective animal behaviour, particularly of ant colonies. His Ant Lab at Bristol pioneered the use of Temnothorax (Temnothorax albipennis) as a model ant species for the study of collective decision-making and complex systems. In a 2009 profile in Science he discusses his pioneering use of radio-frequency identification tags (RFID) glued to the backs of each ant for tracking individuals in their society.

His book Social evolution in ants with Andrew Bourke was an important contribution to the understanding of kin selection theory and sex ratio theory with respect to social evolution in insects, while his co-authored book Self-organization in biological systems has been cited well over 3000 times

Temnothorax albipennis ants have been observed teaching each other through a process known as tandem running. An experienced forager leads a naive nest-mate to a newly discovered resource such as food or an empty nest site. The follower obtains knowledge of the route by following in the footsteps of the tutor, maintaining contact with its antennae. Both leader and follower are aware of the progress made by the other with the leader slowing when the follower lags and speeding up when the follower gets too close. Depending on how far away a new resource is, colonies will modulate the number of tandem runs that they perform, with a greater number of tandem runs occurring when the desired resource is more distant. Furthermore, the relative contribution that workers make to this process differs widely among individuals, with certain ants attempting many more tandem runs than others.
