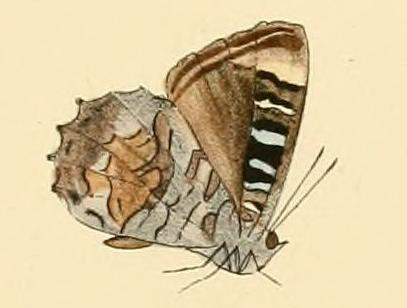

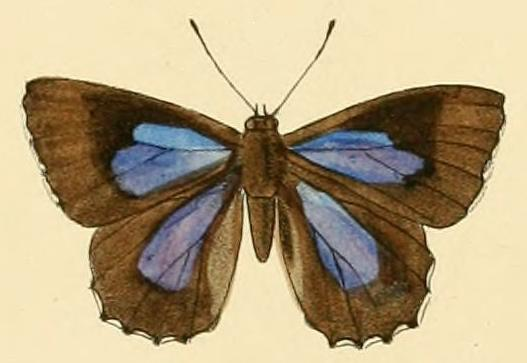

Scientific classification
- Kingdom: Animalia
- Phylum: Arthropoda
- Class: Insecta
- Order: Lepidoptera
- Family: Lycaenidae
- Genus: Ogyris
- Species: O. olane

Binomial name
- Ogyris olane Hewitson, 1862

Synonyms
- Ogyris ocela Waterhouse, 1934

= Ogyris olane =

Species of butterfly

Ogyris olane, the Olane azure, is a butterfly in the family Lycaenidae. It is found in Australia, where it is found in most of the eastern half, including Queensland, New South Wales, Victoria and South Australia.

The wingspan is about 40 mm (1.6 in).

== Subspecies ==
- Ogyris olane olane (inland southern Queensland to South Australia)
- Ogyris olane ocela Waterhouse, 1934 (southern Queensland to coastal Victoria)
