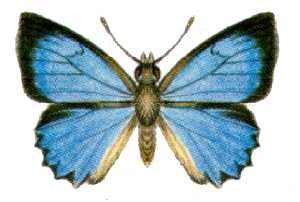

Scientific classification
- Domain: Eukaryota
- Kingdom: Animalia
- Phylum: Arthropoda
- Class: Insecta
- Order: Lepidoptera
- Family: Lycaenidae
- Genus: Ogyris
- Species: O. ianthis

Binomial name
- Ogyris ianthis Waterhouse, 1900

= Ogyris ianthis =

Species of butterfly

Ogyris ianthis, commonly known as the golden azure or Sydney azure, is a butterfly of the family Lycaenidae. It is an uncommon species found in localised areas around Sydney and northern New South Wales and into southern Queensland. It inhabits dry sclerophyll forest and open woodland on sandstone soils.

Both males and females have a wingspan of around 33 mm. The male above is pale blue with black margins, and pale brown on the underside. The female is golden orange with blackish margins on the upperside and more brownish on the underside.

The larvae feed upon various species in the mistletoe family, including Amyema miquelii, A. linophylla, A. quandang, Dendrophthoe glabrescens, D. vitellina and Muellerina eucalyptoides. As with many Lycaenidae, sugar ants attend the larvae, in this case the species Froggatella kirbii.
