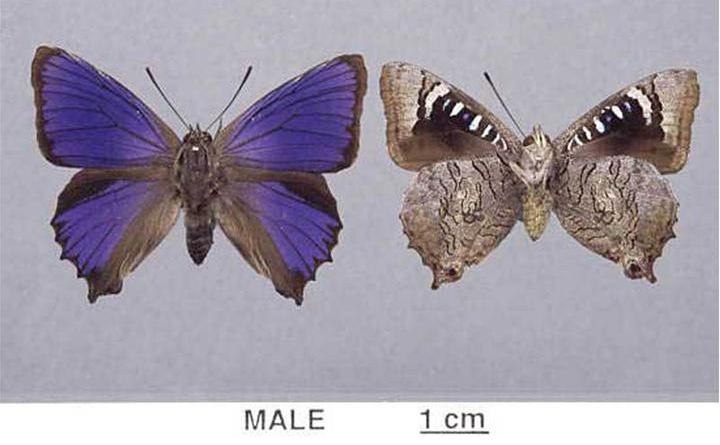
- Ogyris genoveva male

Scientific classification
- Kingdom: Animalia
- Phylum: Arthropoda
- Class: Insecta
- Order: Lepidoptera
- Family: Lycaenidae
- Tribe: Arhopalini
- Genus: Ogyris; Angas, 1847

Synonyms
- Ogyris Westwood, [1851].

= Ogyris =

Butterfly genus in family Lycaenidae

Ogyris is an Australiaian genus of butterflies in the family Lycaenidae. Ogyris genera are vulnerable and endangered due to agriculture and urban development, because of their restricted distribution and habitat specificity, and are at risk for environmental change.

== Species ==
- Ogyris abrota Westwood, 1851
- Ogyris aenone Waterhouse, 1902
- Ogyris amaryllis Hewitson, 1862
- Ogyris aurantiaca Rebel, 1912
- Ogyris barnardi Miskin, 1890
- Ogyris faciepicta Strand, 1911
- Ogyris genoveva Hewitson, [1853]
- Ogyris halmaturia (Tepper, 1890)
- Ogyris ianthis Waterhouse, 1900
- Ogyris idmo Hewitson, 1862
- Ogyris iphis Waterhouse & Lyell, 1914
- Ogyris meeki Rothschild, 1900
- Ogyris olane Hewitson, 1862
- Ogyris oroetes Hewitson, 1862
- Ogyris otanes C. & R. Felder, [1865]
- Ogyris subterrestris Field, 1999
- Ogyris zosine Hewitson, [1853]
