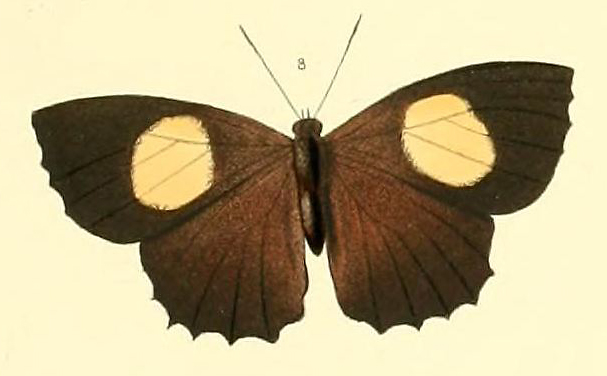

Scientific classification
- Kingdom: Animalia
- Phylum: Arthropoda
- Class: Insecta
- Order: Lepidoptera
- Family: Lycaenidae
- Genus: Ogyris
- Species: O. abrota

Binomial name
- Ogyris abrota Westwood, 1851

Synonyms
- Ogyris abrota Doubleday, 1847; Ogyris damo Doubleday, 1847; Ogyris damo Westwood, [1851]

= Ogyris abrota =

Species of butterfly

Ogyris abrota, the dark purple azure, is a butterfly in the family Lycaenidae. It is found in Australia, from southern Queensland to south-eastern Australia.

The wingspan is about 40 mm.
