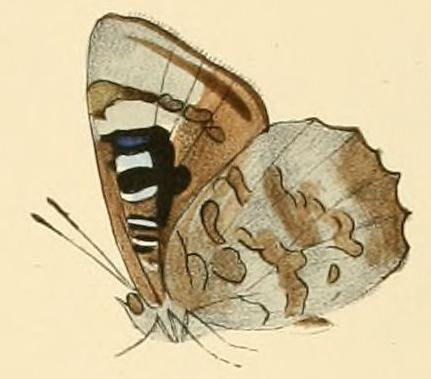

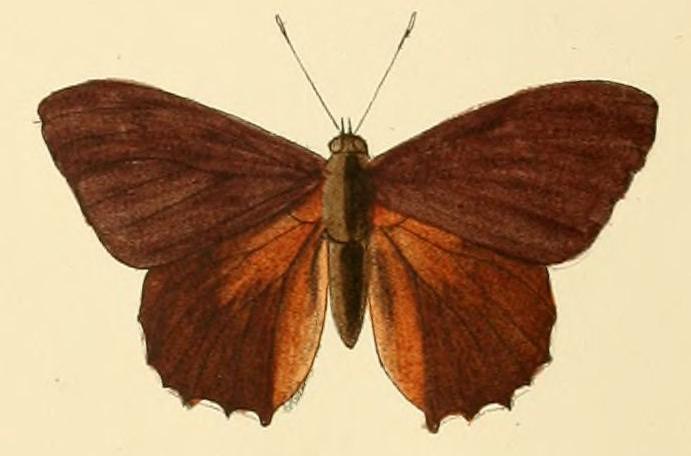

Scientific classification
- Kingdom: Animalia
- Phylum: Arthropoda
- Class: Insecta
- Order: Lepidoptera
- Family: Lycaenidae
- Genus: Ogyris
- Species: O. idmo

Binomial name
- Ogyris idmo Hewitson, 1862

Synonyms
- Ogyris idmo Doubleday, 1847; Ogyris orontas Hewitson, 1862; Ogyris halmaturia Tepper, 1890; Ogyris waterhouseri Bethune-Baker, 1905

= Ogyris idmo =

Species of butterfly

Ogyris idmo, the large brown azure, is a butterfly in the family Lycaenidae. It is found in Australia, where it is found in Victoria, South Australia and southern Western Australia.

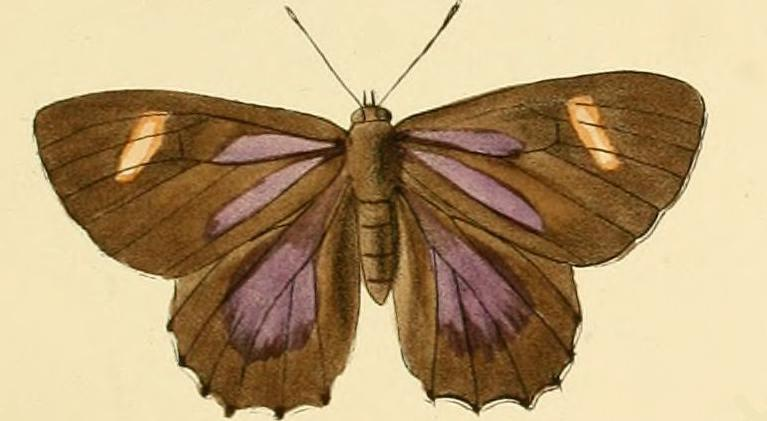

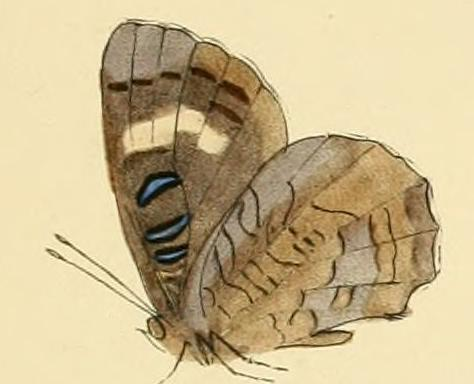

== Subspecies ==
- Ogyris idmo idmo (Western Australia)
- Ogyris idmo halmaturia Tepper, 1890 (Kangaroo Island)
- Ogyris idmo waterhouseri Bethune-Baker, 1905 (western Victoria)
