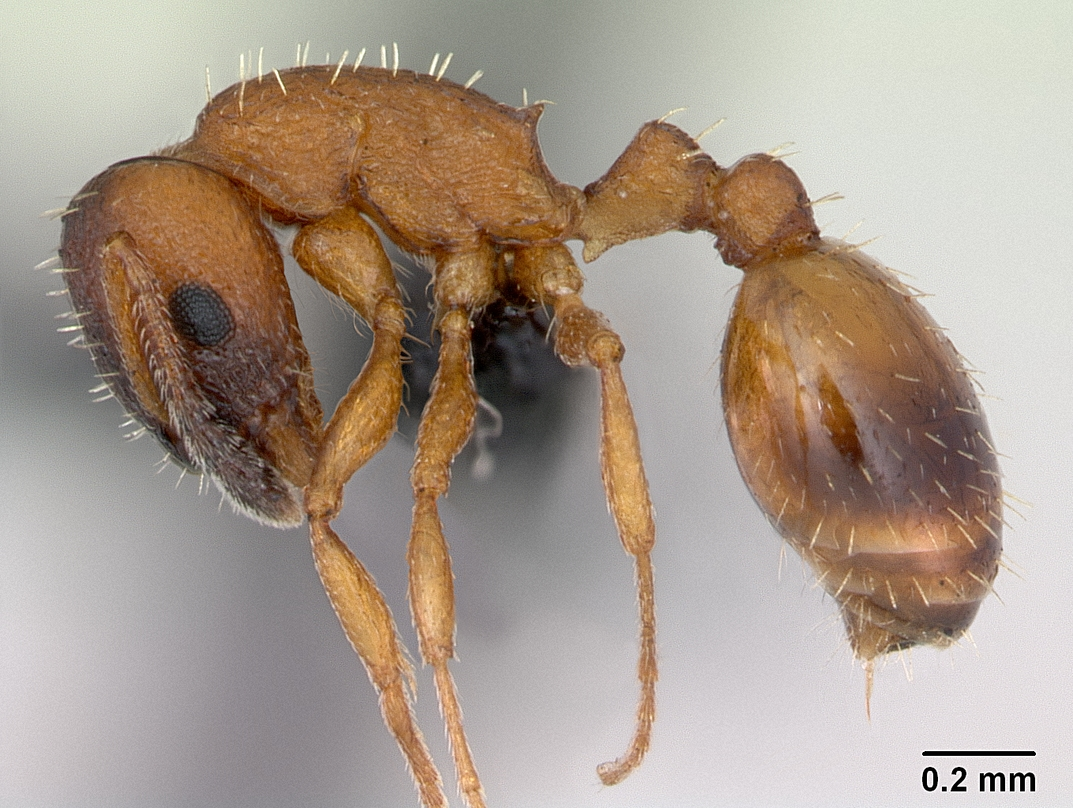

Scientific classification
- Kingdom: Animalia
- Phylum: Arthropoda
- Clade: Pancrustacea
- Class: Insecta
- Order: Hymenoptera
- Family: Formicidae
- Subfamily: Myrmicinae
- Genus: Temnothorax
- Species: T. albipennis

Binomial name
- Temnothorax albipennis Curtis, 1854

Synonyms
- T. tuberointerruptus

= Temnothorax albipennis =

Species of ant

Temnothorax albipennis, the rock ant is a species of small ant in the subfamily Myrmicinae. It occurs in Europe and builds simple nests in rock crevices.

== Description ==
This species has the typical ant body pattern of head, mesosoma and metasoma, with the first two segments of the metasoma forming a distinct waist. It is light brown and has a few short pale coloured hairs. The antennae are elbowed and there are a pair of compound eyes and three ocelli.

== Biology ==
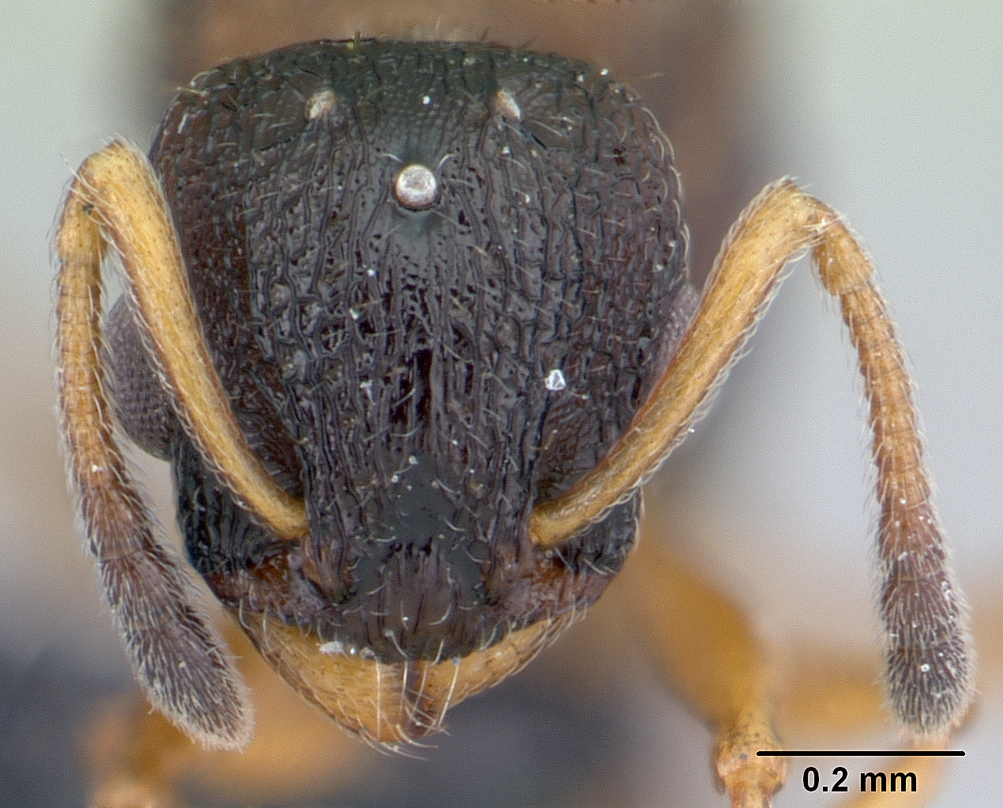
View of head from above

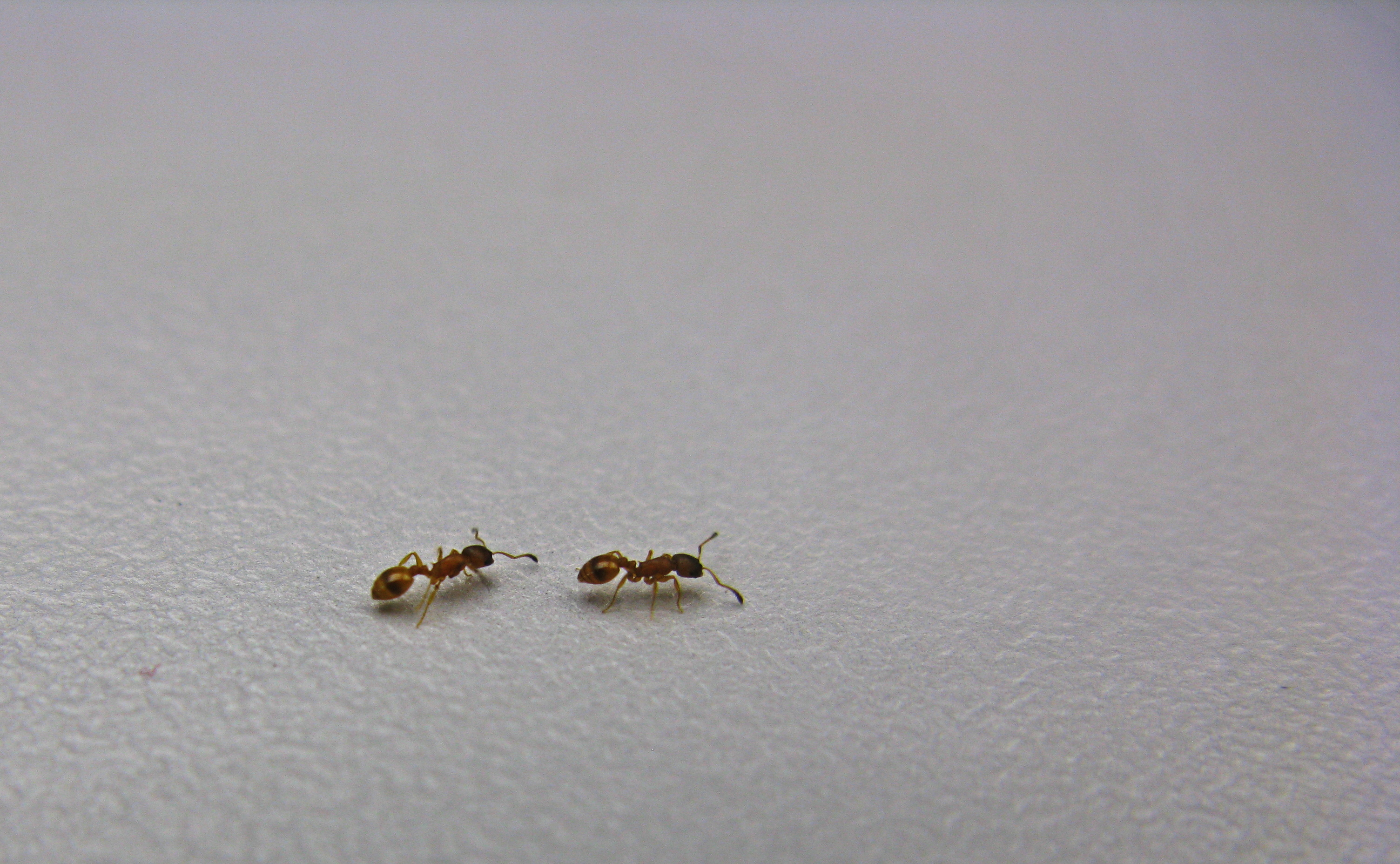
Temnothorax albipennis workers performing a tandem run

As with other ants, there is a single, relatively large queen that lays eggs in the nest and a large number of workers. These are all non-breeding females and leave the nest to forage and collect building materials for its construction and repair.

T. albipennis builds simple nests in cracks in rocks, enclosed by walls built from tiny pebbles and grains of sand. In an experiment where two sizes of sand grain were offered to ants that were foraging for building materials, the ants always chose the smaller grains although this was wasteful in terms of building efficiency. T. albipennis scouts show behavioural lateralization when exploring unknown nest sites, showing a population-level bias to prefer left turns. One possible reason for this is that its environment is partly maze-like and consistently turning in one direction is a good way to search and exit mazes without getting lost. This turning bias is correlated with slight asymmetries in the ants' compound eyes (differential ommatidia count). Another experiment examined the division of labour in ant colonies and found that there tended to be a few high performance workers in small colonies which performed tasks considerably more efficiently than the other workers. This was not the case in larger colonies, and in both cases, there were a high proportion of inactive workers.

Ants are one of the most successful insects on the planet and there is a long-held view that this is because of the division of labour and the way certain workers specialise in certain tasks. An experiment was carried out to examine whether these specialist ants actually performed the task better than other workers. The ants were marked with drops of paint and then were videotaped while they performed such tasks as foraging, transporting the brood and nest building. The conclusions were that, though some ants performed a range of jobs and others specialised in a single task, the latter were found not to be any more efficient at their selected tasks than were the generalists. However the specialists did put in more time on the job than the other ants so the colony overall benefited from their specialisation. Research tracking T. albipennis movements found that they move in similar ways both outside and inside the nest, suggesting that workers are principally generalists equipped to do multiple tasks. The duration of each new ant movement appears to be predetermined to some degree (this is known as motor planning), which may make navigating their complex society easier. However, a reanalysis of the same data reached a different conclusion, suggesting that the previous conclusions need further justification. Another behaviour exhibited by colonies of this species is the ability to react to predator attacks as a single unit. It has been shown that colonies will respond differentially to predation events dependent on their location within the colony, and workers will withdraw or disperse appropriately to enable effective mitigation of mortality.

Ants of this species have been observed teaching each other through a process known as tandem running. An experienced forager leads a naïve nest-mate to a newly discovered resource such as food or an empty nest site. The follower obtains knowledge of the route by following in the footsteps of the tutor, maintaining contact with its antennae. Both leader and follower are aware of the progress made by the other with the leader slowing when the follower lags and speeding up when the follower gets too close. Depending on how far away a new resource is, colonies will modulate the number of tandem runs that they perform, with a greater number of tandem runs occurring when the desired resource is more distant. Furthermore, the relative contribution that workers make to this process differs widely among individuals, with certain ants attempting many more tandem runs than others.
