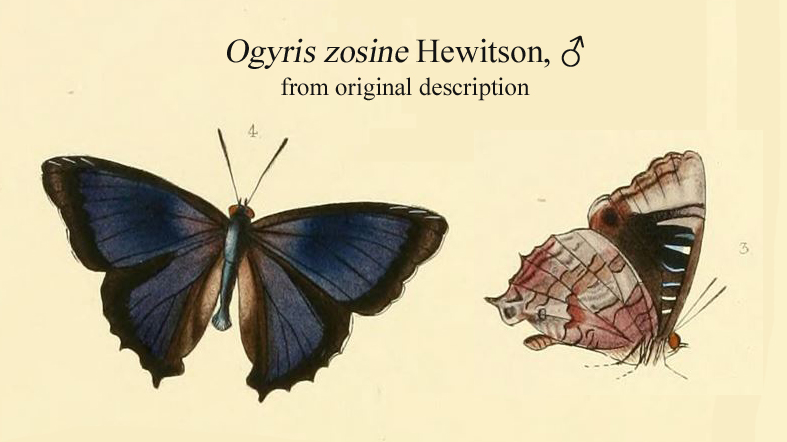

Scientific classification
- Kingdom: Animalia
- Phylum: Arthropoda
- Class: Insecta
- Order: Lepidoptera
- Family: Lycaenidae
- Genus: Ogyris
- Species: O. zosine

Binomial name
- Ogyris zosine Hewitson, 1853

Synonyms
- Ogyris zenobia Bethune-Baker, 1916; Ogyris iberia Waterhouse & Lyell, 1914; Ogyris typhon Waterhouse & Lyell, 1914; Ogyris zolivia Waterhouse, 1941

= Ogyris zosine =

Species of butterfly

Ogyris zosine, the northern purple azure, is a member of the family Lycaenidae.

Their wingspan is 43-47mm. The larvae feed upon various species in the mistletoe family. As with many Lycaenidae, sugar ants attend the larvae. Mature larvae have pinkish-grey bodies with dark purplish-red spots.

== Subspecies ==
- Ogyris zosine zosine (Brisbane to Ballina)
- Ogyris zosine typhon Waterhouse & Lyell, 1914 (Darwin, Cooktown to Rockhampton)
- Ogyris zosine zolivia Waterhouse, 1941 (Queensland: Hayman, Whitsunday Islands)
