= Camponotus longideclivis =

Scientific classification
- Kingdom: Animalia
- Phylum: Arthropoda
- Class: Insecta
- Order: Hymenoptera
- Family: Formicidae
- Subfamily: Formicinae
- Genus: Camponotus
- Subgenus: Tanaemyrmex
- Species: C. longideclivis

Binomial name
- Camponotus longideclivis McArthur, 1996

Species of ant

Camponotus longideclivis is a species of ant in the genus Camponotus. Described by McArthur in 1996, the species is restricted to Western Australia.

== See also ==
- List of ants of Australia
- List of Camponotus species
