= Tandem running =

Social learning phenomenon in ants and termites

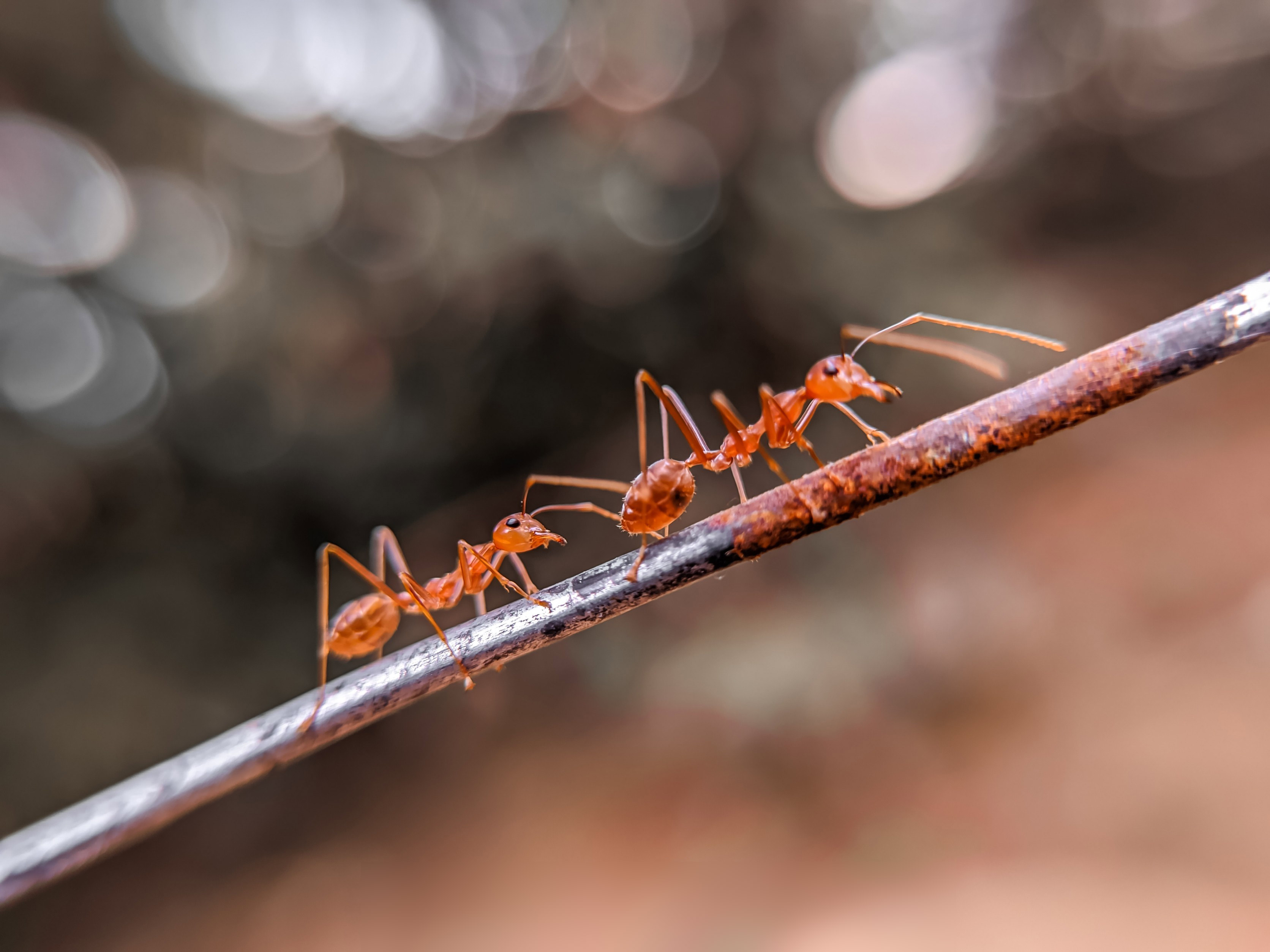
Two ants walking in tandem.

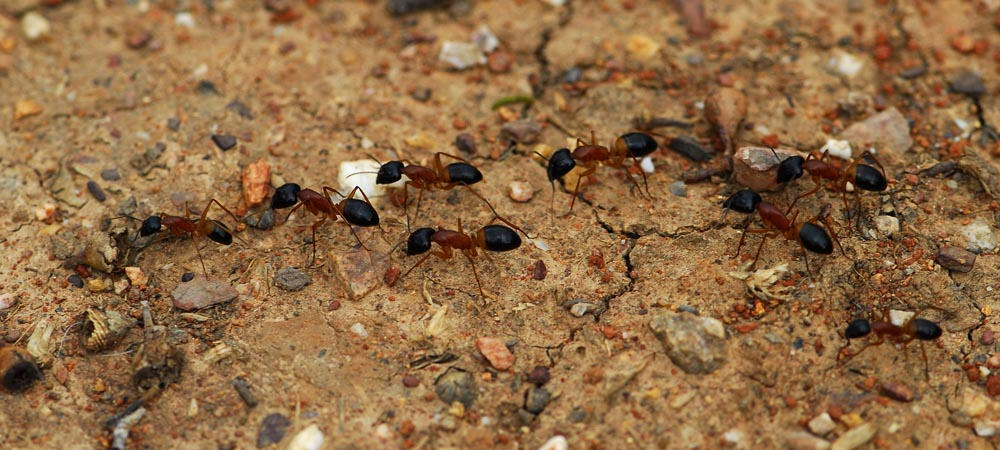
Camponotus consobrinus workers recruit additional nestmates to newly discovered food sources. The lead worker (on the left) has returned to the nest and is leading the remaining workers back to the food source.

Tandem running is a pair movement coordination observed in ants and termites.

In ants, tandem running is used for social learning, by which one ant leads another native ant from the nest to the food source it has found. Tandem running is also used to find and choose better, new nest sites to which the colony can emigrate. The follower ant maintains contact with the lead ant by frequently touching the leader's legs and abdomen with its antennae. As predators, scavengers, and herbivores, ants have a variety of food sources, for which they may journey as far as 200 meters from their nest, spraying a scent trail as they go. To lead their kin to new food sources, ants demonstrate one of the few examples of interactive teaching outside of the mammalian class. Social learning by teaching requires that the naive observer change its behavior and acquire some skills or knowledge faster than it would have independently and that the teacher incur some cost. In order for the follower ant to learn landmarks, the leader must travel much slower and make frequent stops to check for her follower. Ultimately, the knowledge of the route to the new food source can be passed throughout the colony as one follower becomes a leader, making tandem running an effective time-saving practice.

In termites, tandem running behavior is used by a mating pair. During a brief period, alates (winged adults) disperse from their nests. Both females and males land on the ground, shed their wings, and run to search for a mating partner. Upon encountering, a pair performs a tandem run, while seeking a suitable site for colony foundation. Tandem running in termites involves communication via sex pheromones, and all mating pairs engage in this process. For these reasons, tandem running in termites is considered a form of sexual behavior.

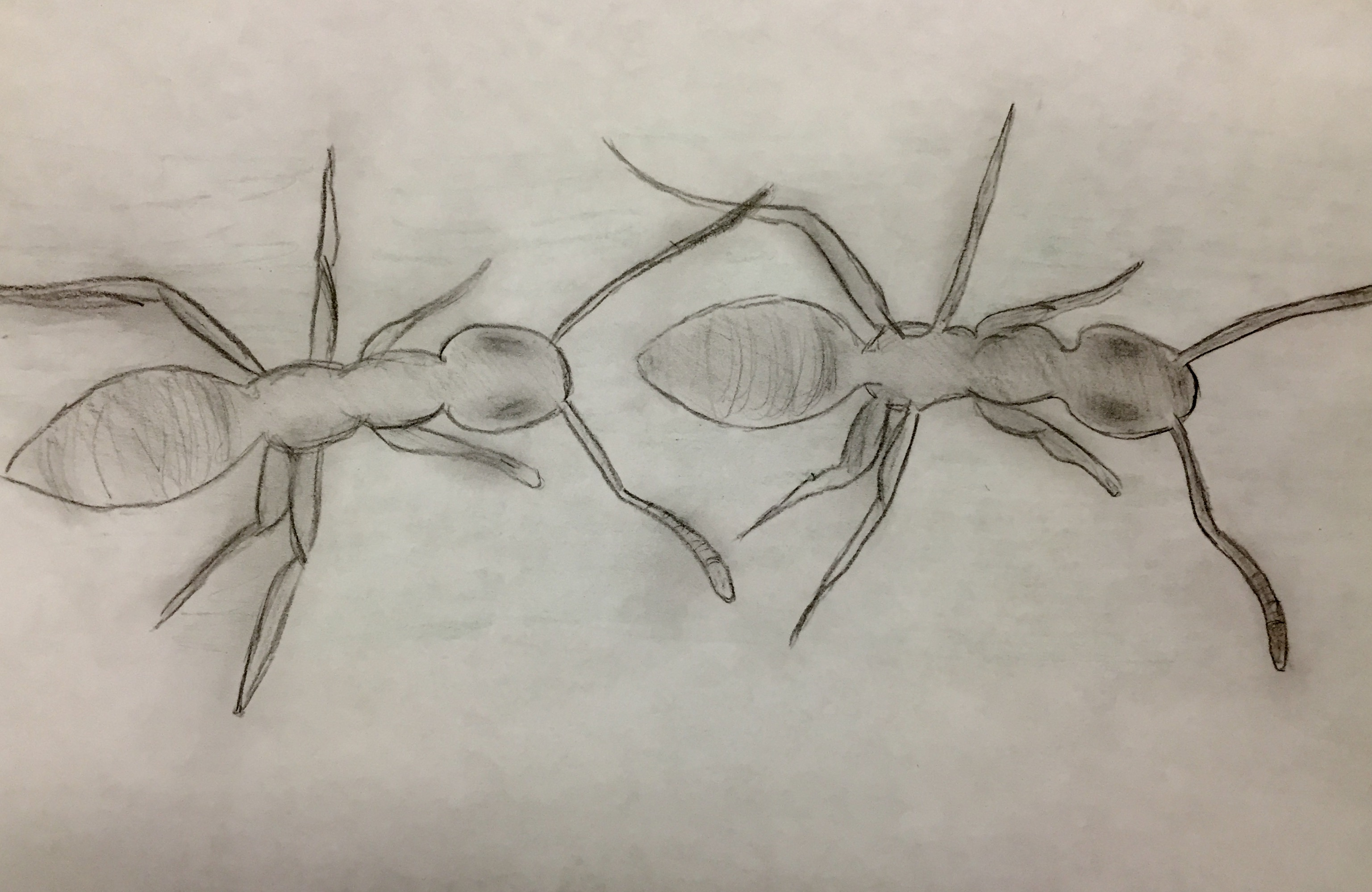
The following ant frequently touches the legs of the lead ant with its antennae to maintain contact in the tandem run.

== Species that use tandem running ==
=== Ants (By genus) ===
- Temnothorax
- Diacamma
- Pachycondyla
- Camponotus
- Hypoponera
- Paltothyreus
- Ponera
- Cardiocondyla
- Chalepoxenus
- Harpagoxenus
- Leptothorax

=== Termites (By genus for each sub/family) ===
- Mastotermitidae: Mastotermes
- Archotermopsidae: Zootermopsis
- Stolotermitidae: Porotermes
- Hodotermitidae: Hodotermes
- Kalotermitidae: Kalotermes, Paraneotermes, Glyptotermes, Incisitermes, Cryptotermes
- Rhinotermitidae; Psammotermes, Prorhinotermes, Reticulitermes, Heterotermes, Coptotermes
- Termitidae, Macrotermitinae: Pseudacanthotermes, Microtermes, Ancistrotermes, Macrotermes, Odontotermes, Hypotermes
- Termitidae, Apicotermitinae: Anoplotermes
- Termitidae, Nasutitermitinae: Trinervitermes, Nasutitermes
- Termitidae, Termitinae: Microcerotermes, Amitermes, Pericapritermes, Inquilinitermes
- Termitidae, Syntermitinae: Embiratermes, Procornitermes, Cornitermes
- Termitidae, Cubitermitinae: Cubitermes

== How ants perform tandem running ==
Individual ants utilize celestial and land cues as well as their own motion detection to navigate, but scout foraging is not their only strategy for finding food resources. Up to 35 percent of ants setting out from the nest forage as tandem pairs.

Studies have found that vision only plays a role in navigation during tandem runs, but plays no role for the followers in following the leader. The follower is only dependent on tactile and phenomenal information. Experiments in which researchers impair the vision of ants found that blind ants were more likely to follow than to lead, but could still occupy either the role of follower or leader, however, for pairs where the leader was fully sighted, their tandem run was usually smoother and faster. Thus, it can be concluded that sight is used for navigation along with other orientation systems, but is not the mechanism by which ants perform their tandem run. Research has shown that leaders rely on tactile feedback from followers during a tandem run. The follower will follow closely behind the leader, and the leader will run rapidly only after it is tapped by the antennae of the follower.

During tandem runs, in addition to tactile signals, ants may also use chemical cues. Pheromone trails help maintain the bond between the ants, facilitate learning, and assist with navigation. The chemical trails may allow followers to stop and examine landmarks before rejoining the leader. Leaders, which are the teachers, are more likely to lay trails during forward tandem runs than during reverse tandem runs. Most leaders deploy their gaster down during forward tandem runs, while the followers do not. During reverse tandem runs, most leaders deploy their gaster in the up or middle position because by this time the ants have learned the route and trails have already been laid, so followers are less likely to get lost.

Follower ants are not necessarily naive foragers. When lead ants were experimentally removed during tandem runs, 40 percent of follower ants successfully reached the foraging area after a brief search, providing evidence that the followers were already experienced foragers.

== Costs and benefits ==
The time it takes for the leader to reach the food source during a tandem run is increased fourfold. However, the follower will be able to find the food source significantly faster during a tandem run compared to searching alone. Additionally, the leader will benefit by having another ant help carry food back to the nest. Experienced foraging ants will often participate in tandem runs as a follower to a familiar tree or foraging site. This may be because trees and other sites are often complex structures to navigate, and the leader may guide the experienced ant to a new food source within the same system. There is also a cost to following ants who get separated from the leader (or "lost") during a tandem run. When tandem running ants were experimentally separated in the lab, lost ants engaged in searching behavior, where they would often return to the point where they were separated from their leader, and their walking speed was slowed by almost 50%. There is a benefit to being separated from the leader in some cases however; independent exploration is critical to the practice of tandem running. Through independent exploration, ants can discover new and more direct routes and thus reduce the duration of their subsequent tandem runs that they will lead. Independent exploration is the basis of route improvement in tandem running.

== Teaching and social learning ==
Tandem running is a form of recruitment and communication that involves teaching and social learning. Experience influences the tendency to engage in tandem running more than age. Temnothorax albipennis of all ages are able to participate in tandem running, but experienced individuals are more likely to do so. Older experienced ants are also more likely to lead slowly and be precise. Young inexperienced ants are capable of leading and following in tandem runs, but they lead faster and are less accurate.

When an individual ant practices on its own it can learn even more. Ants are able to shorten the length of tandem runs and transfer information faster only if they independently explore the area in between being a follower and becoming a leader. Independent exploration is beneficial because it leads to an improved route and more accurate leadership of tandem runs. Only one bout of independent exploration is necessary for improvement, and extra independent explorations do not further improve tandem runs. If a leader happens to lose its follower during a run, it may continue to its destination rather than turning around to find another follower because this is a chance for independent exploration, which can improve future runs. Tandem running combines social learning with individual learning in order to maximize benefits of this practice. The exact information that is transferred between the follower and leader is not known, but the following ant acquires the same information that it would have gotten if it had found the nest on its own. If the new nest site is far from the old one, tandem running allows followers to find it faster than they would have if they used individual exploration.

== Tandem running in termites ==
In Reticulitermes and Coptotermes, female leads the tandem and releases a short-range sex pheromone to guide the male, and the male touches the female's abdomen with its antennae and mouthparts, indicating its continued presence. When a pair is accidentally separated, females pause and males engage in intensive search for the partner. This sexually dimorphic movement facilitates the encounter.

The form of tandem running behavior is variable across termite species. In neoisopteran termites, only females have strong sex-pairing pheromones, and sex role is strictly fixed in heterosexual pairs; females perform leader role, and males perform follower role. On the other hand, sex role is more flexible in other lineages. Also, tandem running behavior can be used between workers in Mastotermes darwiniensis.

In Reticulitermes speratus, tandem running has been observed as homosexual behavior with males following males and females following females in order to reduce predation. By participating in tandem running, the termites increase their encounter risk of predators, but this risk is outweighed by the benefits of decreasing their post-encounter risk. The predator is able to capture only one animal at a time, so by utilizing tandem running, each termite's individual risk of predation is decreased by the dilution effect. During same-sex tandem run in Reticulitermes speratus, one individual expresses the behavior of the other sex. In female-female pairs, follower female shows typical male behaviors. And in male-male pairs, leader males show typical female behavior.

Tandem running is also used for sexual selection in termites. There is often competition between tandem running males over which termite will be in the back position. The male in the back position is thus stronger and larger, and when the pair of tandem runners encounters a female, she will favor the back male.
