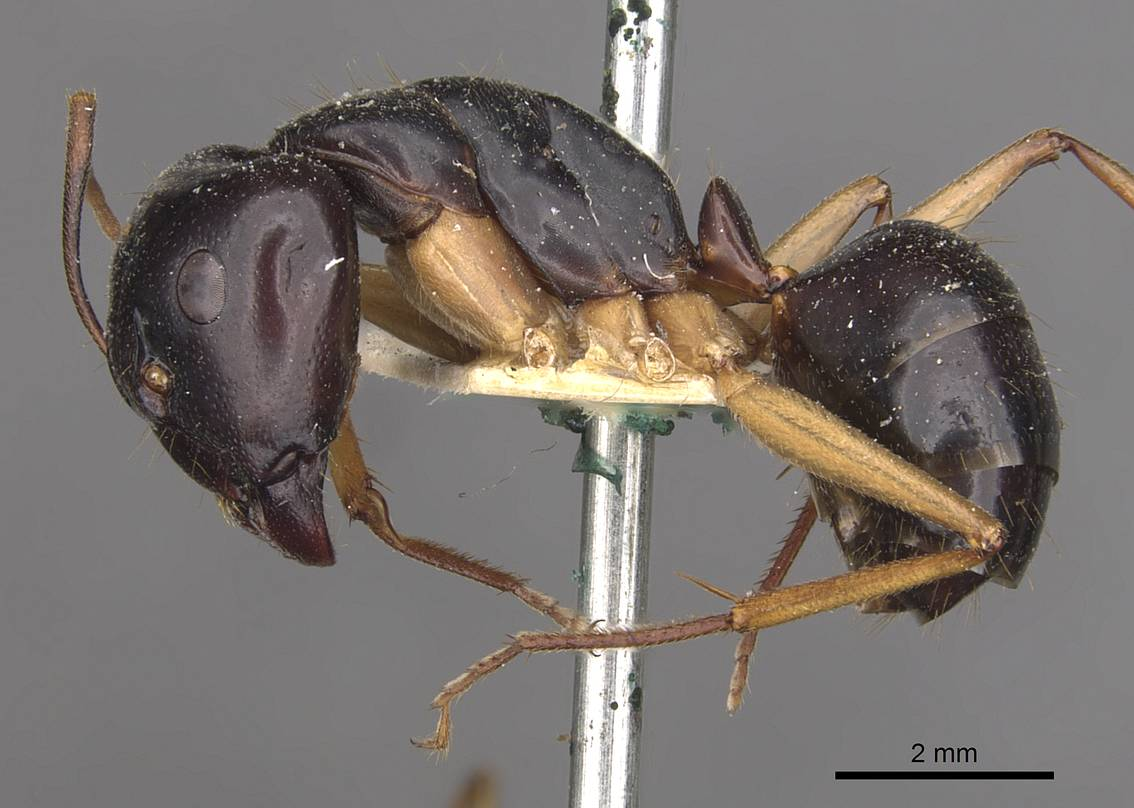

Scientific classification
- Kingdom: Animalia
- Phylum: Arthropoda
- Clade: Pancrustacea
- Class: Insecta
- Order: Hymenoptera
- Family: Formicidae
- Subfamily: Formicinae
- Genus: Camponotus
- Subgenus: Tanaemyrmex
- Species: C. prostans

Binomial name
- Camponotus prostans Forel, 1910

= Camponotus prostans =

Species of ant

Camponotus prostans is a species of ant in the genus Camponotus. Described by Auguste-Henri Forel in 1910, the species is restricted to Western Australia.

== See also ==
- List of ants of Australia
- List of Camponotus species
