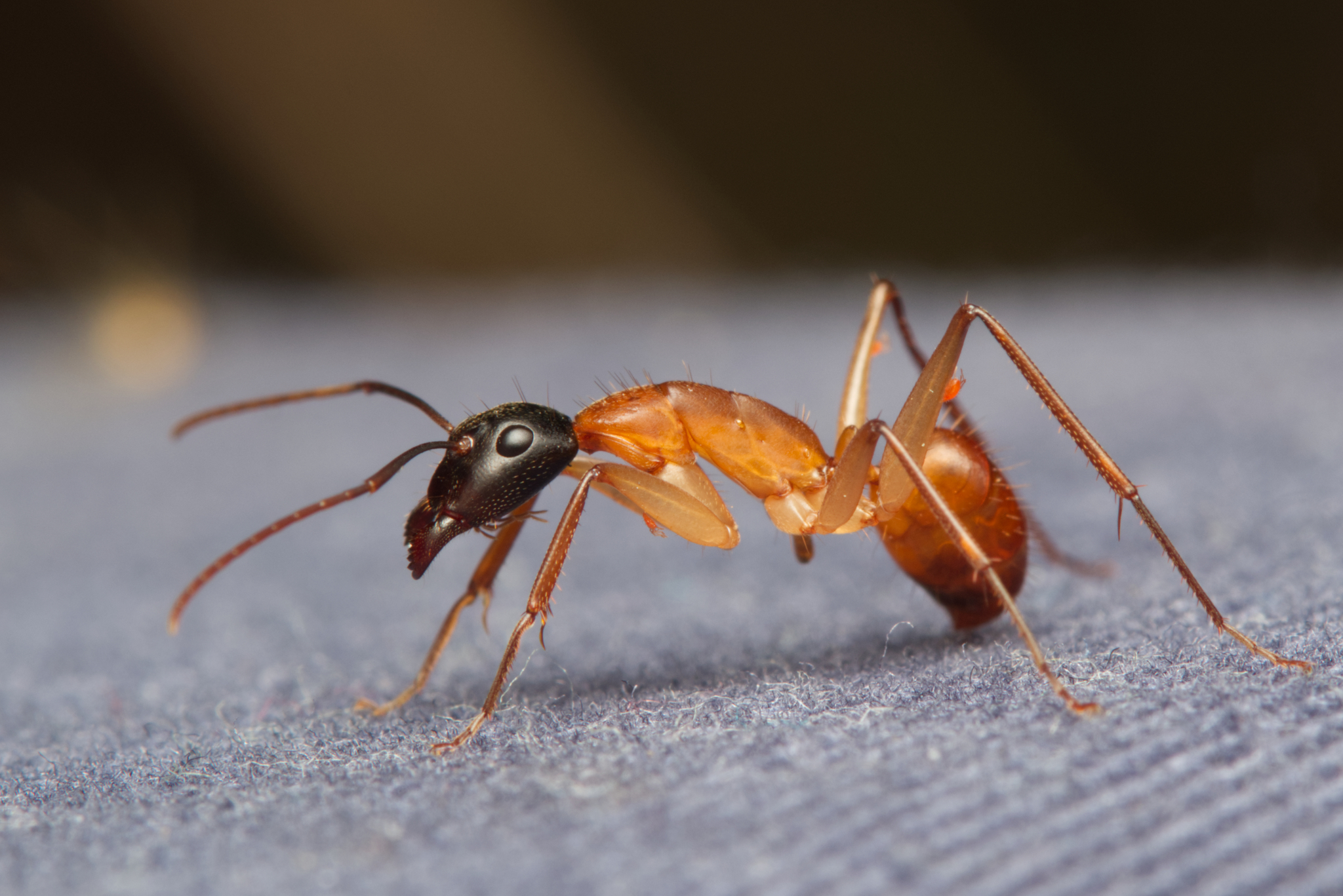

Scientific classification
- Kingdom: Animalia
- Phylum: Arthropoda
- Class: Insecta
- Order: Hymenoptera
- Family: Formicidae
- Subfamily: Formicinae
- Genus: Camponotus
- Subgenus: Tanaemyrmex
- Species: C. eastwoodi

Binomial name
- Camponotus eastwoodi McArthur, 1996

= Camponotus eastwoodi =

Species of ant

Camponotus eastwoodi is a species of ant in the genus Camponotus. Described by McArthur in 1996, the species is restricted to Queensland and New South Wales.

== See also ==
- List of ants of Australia
- List of Camponotus species
