= Camponotus clarior =

Scientific classification
- Kingdom: Animalia
- Phylum: Arthropoda
- Class: Insecta
- Order: Hymenoptera
- Family: Formicidae
- Subfamily: Formicinae
- Genus: Camponotus
- Subgenus: Tanaemyrmex
- Species: C. clarior

Binomial name
- Camponotus clarior Forel, 1902

Species of ant

Camponotus clarior is a species of ant in the genus Camponotus. Described by Auguste-Henri Forel in 1902, the species is native to Australia.

== See also ==
- List of ants of Australia
- List of Camponotus species
