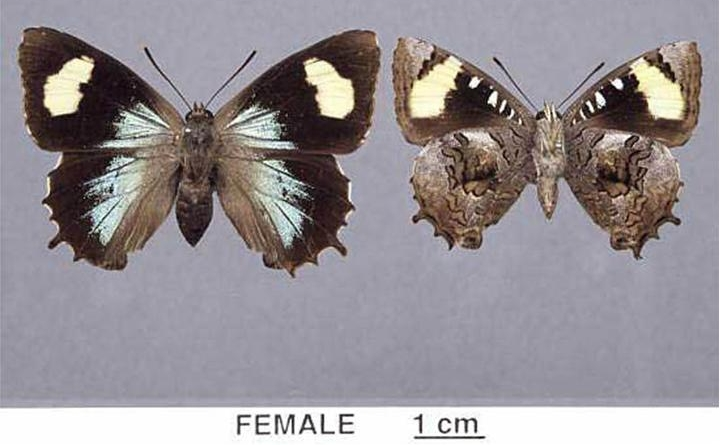
- Female
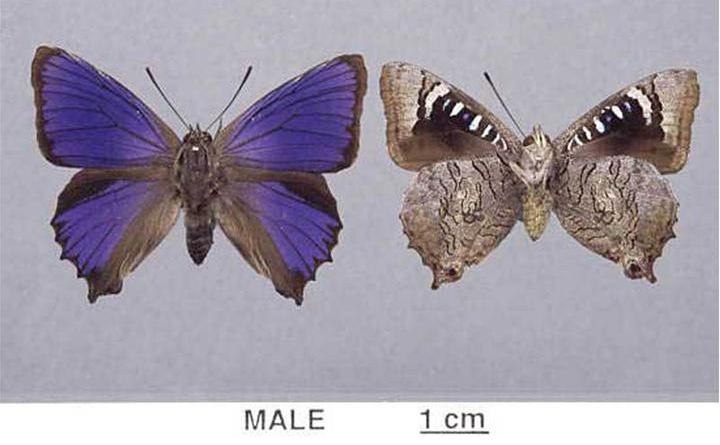
- Male

Scientific classification
- Kingdom: Animalia
- Phylum: Arthropoda
- Class: Insecta
- Order: Lepidoptera
- Family: Lycaenidae
- Genus: Ogyris
- Species: O. genoveva

Binomial name
- Ogyris genoveva Hewitson, [1853]

Synonyms
- Ogyris magna Bethune-Baker, 1905; Ogyris araxes Burns, 1931, nec Waterhouse & Lyell, 1914; Ogyris duaringa Bethune-Baker, 1905; Ogyris gela Waterhouse, 1941; Ogyris araxes Waterhouse & Lyell, 1914; Ogyris genua Waterhouse, 1941; Ogyris splendida Tindale, 1923

= Ogyris genoveva =

Species of butterfly

Ogyris genoveva, the genoveva azure or southern purple azure, is a butterfly of the family Lycaenidae. It is found in Australia.

The wingspan is about 50 mm.

The larvae feed on the foliage of various Loranthaceae species, including Amyema, Dendrophthoe and Muellerina species. The larvae live in the nest of Camponotus species.

== Subspecies ==
- Ogyris genoveva genoveva
- Ogyris genoveva duaringa Bethune-Baker, 1905 (Duaringa to Milmerran)
- Ogyris genoveva gela Waterhouse, 1941 (New South Wales)
- Ogyris genoveva araxes Waterhouse & Lyell, 1914 (north-western Victoria)
- Ogyris genoveva genua Waterhouse, 1941 (South Australia (Mount Lofty))
- Ogyris genoveva splendida Tindale, 1923 (South Australia (Flinders Ranges))

== Gallery ==
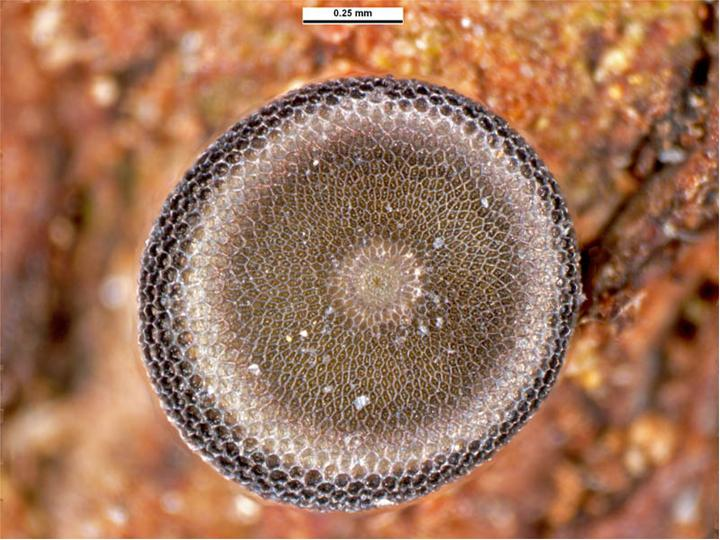
Egg, dorsal view

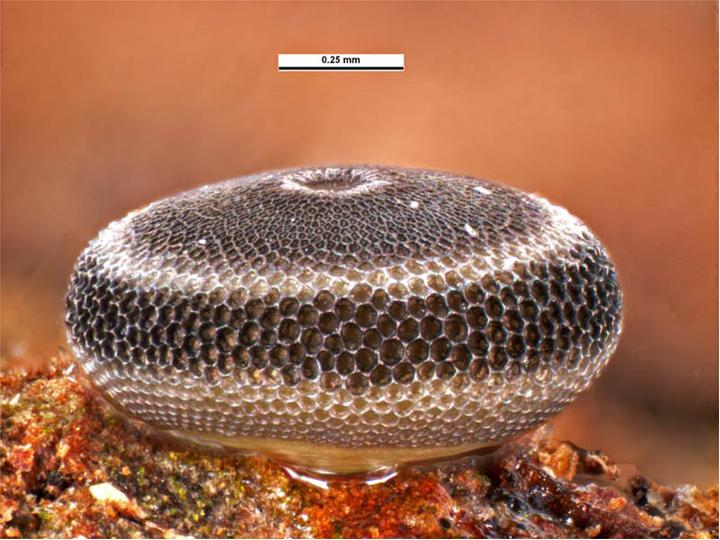
Egg, lateral view

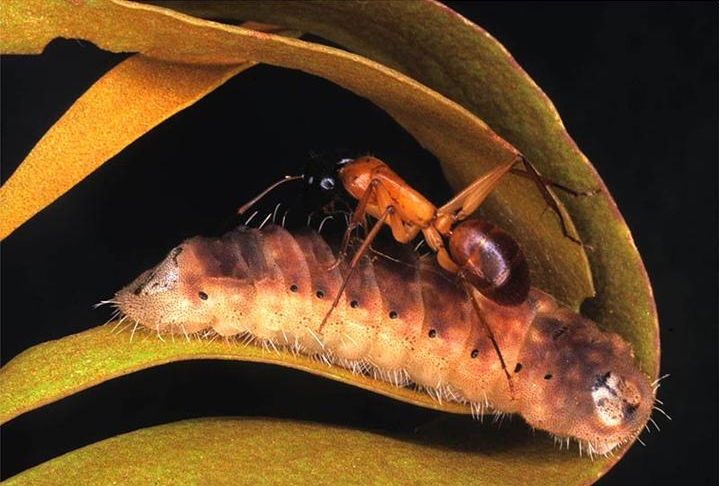
Larva with attendant sugar ant (Camponotus nigriceps)

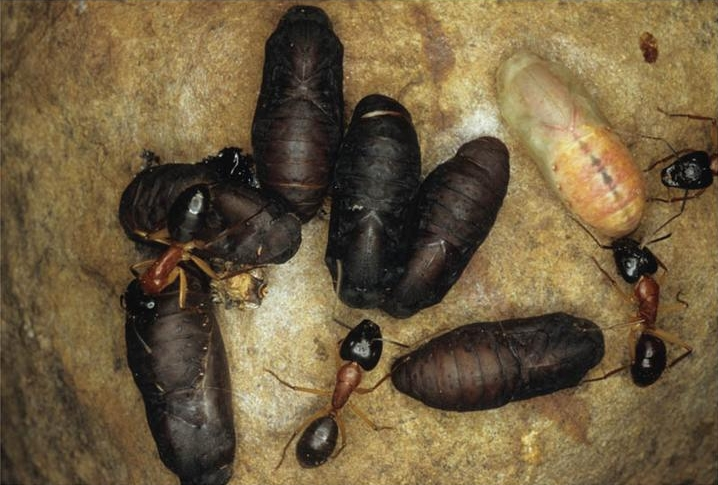
Pupae with attending ants

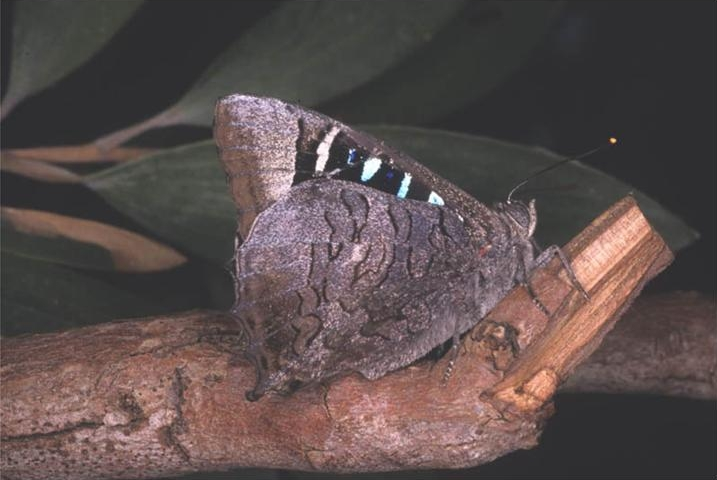
Male - females have a cream patch on the forewing underside
