= Camponotus pallidiceps =

Scientific classification
- Kingdom: Animalia
- Phylum: Arthropoda
- Class: Insecta
- Order: Hymenoptera
- Family: Formicidae
- Subfamily: Formicinae
- Genus: Camponotus
- Subgenus: Tanaemyrmex
- Species: C. pallidiceps

Binomial name
- Camponotus pallidiceps Emery, 1887

Species of ant

Camponotus pallidiceps is a species of ant in the genus Camponotus. Described by Carlo Emery in 1887, the species is restricted to New South Wales.

== See also ==
- List of ants of Australia
- List of Camponotus species
