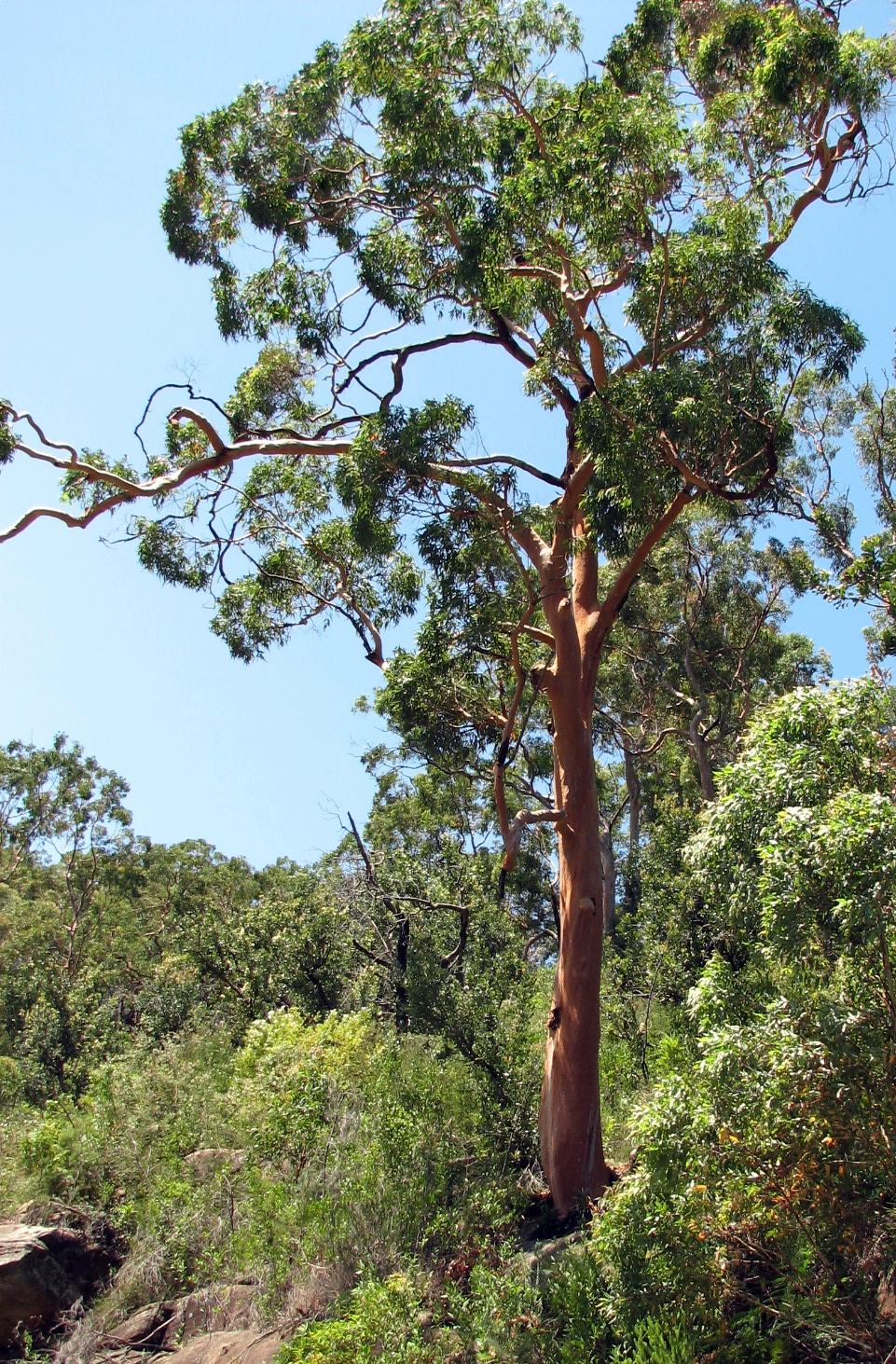
- In Garigal National Park

Conservation status
- Least Concern (IUCN 3.1)

Scientific classification
- Kingdom: Plantae
- Clade: Tracheophytes
- Clade: Angiosperms
- Clade: Eudicots
- Clade: Rosids
- Order: Myrtales
- Family: Myrtaceae
- Genus: Angophora
- Species: A. costata

Binomial name
- Angophora costata (Gaertn.) Britten
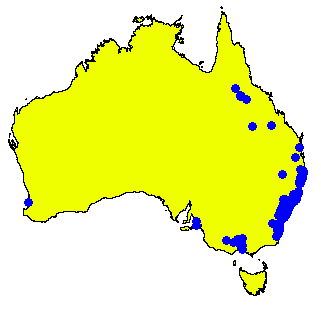
- Occurrence data from AVH

Synonyms
- Metrosideros costata Gaertn.

= Angophora costata =

Sydney red gum

Species of tree

Angophora costata, commonly known as Sydney red gum, rusty gum or smooth-barked apple, is a species of tree that is endemic to eastern Australia. Reaching 30 m (100 ft) in height, the species has distinctive smooth bark that is pinkish or orange-brown when new and fades to grey with age. Its lance-shaped leaves are arranged in opposite pairs along the stems, with white or creamy white flowers appearing from October to December. The flower buds are usually arranged in groups of three, followed by ribbed, oval or bell-shaped fruit.

== Description ==
Angophora costata is a tree that typically grows to a height of 30 m (100 ft) and forms a lignotuber. It has smooth pinkish or orange-brown bark that weathers to grey and is shed in small scales. Young plants and coppice regrowth have sessile, elliptical to egg-shaped leaves arranged in opposite pairs with a stem-clasping base, 60–125 mm (2.5–5 in) long and 20–65 mm (0.8–2.6 in) wide. Adult leaves are arranged in opposite pairs, glossy green but paler on the lower surface, lance-shaped or curved, 70–190 mm (2.8–7.5 in) long and 12–35 mm (0.5–1.4 in) wide on a petiole 9–25 mm (0.4–1.0 in) long. New leaf growth is strongly tinted with red. The flower buds are arranged on the ends of branchlets on a branched peduncle 3–25 mm (0.1–1.0 in) long, each branch of the peduncle with usually three buds on pedicels 3–15 mm (0.1–0.6 in) long. Mature buds are oval to globe-shaped, up to 10 mm (0.4 in) long and 11 mm (0.4 in) wide. There are five sepals up to 3 mm (0.1 in) long and the petals are white to creamy white with a green keel, 3–5 mm (0.1–0.2 in) long and 3–6 mm (0.1–0.2 in) wide. Flowering occurs from October to December. The fruit is an oval or bell-shaped capsule up to 20 mm (0.8 in) long and wide. New seedlings have petiolate round cotyledon leaves 1.5 cm wide and long.

== Taxonomy and naming ==
Sydney red gum was first formally described in 1788 by German botanist Joseph Gaertner and given the name Metrosideros costata in his book De Fructibus et Seminibus Plantarum, from material collected by surveyor David Burton around Port Jackson. The specific epithet (costata) is a Latin word meaning 'ribbed'. English botanist Richard Anthony Salisbury named it Metrisoderos apocynifolia in his 1796 work Prodromus stirpium in horto ad Chapel Allerton vigentium. Spanish taxonomist Antonio José Cavanilles erected the new genus Angophora in 1797 in his book Icones et Descriptiones Plantarum, giving the species the name Angophora lanceolata. English botanist George Bentham used this last name in his Flora Australiensis in 1867.

English botanist James Britten changed the name to Angophora costata in the Journal of Botany, British and Foreign in 1916.

In 1986, Gregory John Leach described three subspecies in the journal Telopea and two names have been accepted by the Australian Plant Census:

- Angophora costata (Gaertn.) Britten subsp. costata has a glabrous floral cup and fruit mostly less than 15 mm (0.6 in) wide;
- Angophora costata subsp. euryphylla L.A.S.Johnson ex G.J.Leach has a hairy floral cup and fruit more than 15 mm (0.6 in) wide. It is found only in a small area including Putty, Howes Valley and Judge Dowling Range in central New South Wales. Genetic analysis published in 2021 showed it not to be distinct from subsp. costata.

A third subspecies, subsp. leiocarpa was reclassified as a separate species Angophora leiocarpa. A phylogenetic analysis of the genus published in 2021 confirmed its genetic distinctness from the two costata subspecies.

Recent genetic work has been published showing Angophora to be more closely related to Eucalyptus than Corymbia, and the name Eucalyptus apocynifolia has been proposed for this species if it were to be placed in the genus Eucalyptus. This has not been taken up by the botanical community.

Common names include Sydney red gum, rusty gum, smooth-barked apple, and smooth-barked angophora. Aboriginal people from the Sydney region knew the tree as kajimbourra.

== Distribution and habitat ==
Angophora costata grows in sandy soil, often over sandstone and occurs naturally in Queensland and New South Wales. It is widely distributed in south-eastern Queensland and disjunctly in the White Mountains National Park. In New South Wales it mainly occurs in coastal areas south from Coffs Harbour to Narooma and as far west as the Blue Mountains. It is found from sea level to an altitude of 300 m (1,000 ft) in areas of predominantly summer rainfall receiving 600 to 1,200 mm (25 to 45 in) a year. Maximum temperatures across its range vary from 25 to 35 °C (77 to 95 °F) and minimum temperatures from 0 to 8 °C (32 to 46 °F), with anywhere from 0 to 50 days of frost.

In Victoria it is a commonly planted ornamental and is naturalised in some places.

It grows in open forest and woodland, in association with such species as Sydney peppermint (Eucalyptus piperita), bangalay (E. botryoides), grey gum (E. punctata), blue-leaved stringybark (E. agglomerata), white mahogany (E. acmenoides), broad-leaved white mahogany (E. umbra), large-fruited red mahogany (E. scias), red bloodwood (Corymbia gummifera), yellow bloodwood (C. eximia), pink bloodwood (C. intermedia) lemon-scented gum (C. citriodora), turpentine (Syncarpia glomulifera), forest oak (Allocasuarina torulosa), and cypress pines (Callitris species), and in hind dune communities with wedding bush (Monotoca elliptica) and burrawang (Macrozamia communis).

== Ecology ==
Angophora costata trees can live over 100 years. The species responds to bushfire by resprouting from epicormic buds and its lignotuber; shoots on branches of older specimens arise after a month, while shoots resprout from the trunk and base of young plants within a month of a hot fire. Seedlings appear within 9 to 10 months.

The tree is parasitised by the long-flowered mistletoe (Dendrophthoe vitellina).

The flowers are eaten by the grey-headed flying fox (Pteropus poliocephalus) and little red flying fox (P. scapulatus), while the seed is eaten by the crimson rosella (Platycercus elegans).

Although the bark of A. costata is smooth, many invertebrates are found there. Several spiders in the family Salticidae, including Servaea vestita, and pseudoscorpions live under loose bark. The flattened bug Stenocotis depressa evades detection by camouflage, and cockroaches and huntsman spiders live under the loose bark at the base of the trunk.

Angophora costata is also susceptible to the fungal pathogens Quambalaria pitotheka, Aulographina eucalypti and Cryptococcus neoformans.

== Uses ==
=== Use in horticulture ===
Smooth-barked apple grows well in a variety of situations and can be easily grown from seed in a loose, well-drained seed-raising mixture. Some specimens have a straight trunk while others have a more branching habit with twisted trunks. The tree sometimes sheds branches and should not be planted close to buildings.

=== Timber ===
The heartwood is hard though not durable. Pale pink-brown in colour, it has a density of 755–1045 kg/m^{3} and a coarse texture. It is not suitable for use on the ground, though it has been used for fencing and rough flooring. The pale sapwood has a width of up to 5 cm (2 in) and is susceptible to attack by borers of the genus Lyctus.

=== Honey ===
This tree produces abundant pollen but little nectar. and the honey produced is not highly regarded.

== Significant individuals ==
Angophora Reserve in the Sydney suburb of Avalon was named after a huge individual, reportedly around 300 years of age. That tree died in the late 20th century. Also in Sydney, the upper Lane Cove River Valley has several large Sydney red gums, one near Conscript Pass was measured at 45 metres tall. The largest known living specimen of A.costata in New Zealand, and potentially the largest in the world, (241 cm (95 in) in diameter) is found at Hobsonville near Auckland.

== Gallery ==
Features of Angophora costata

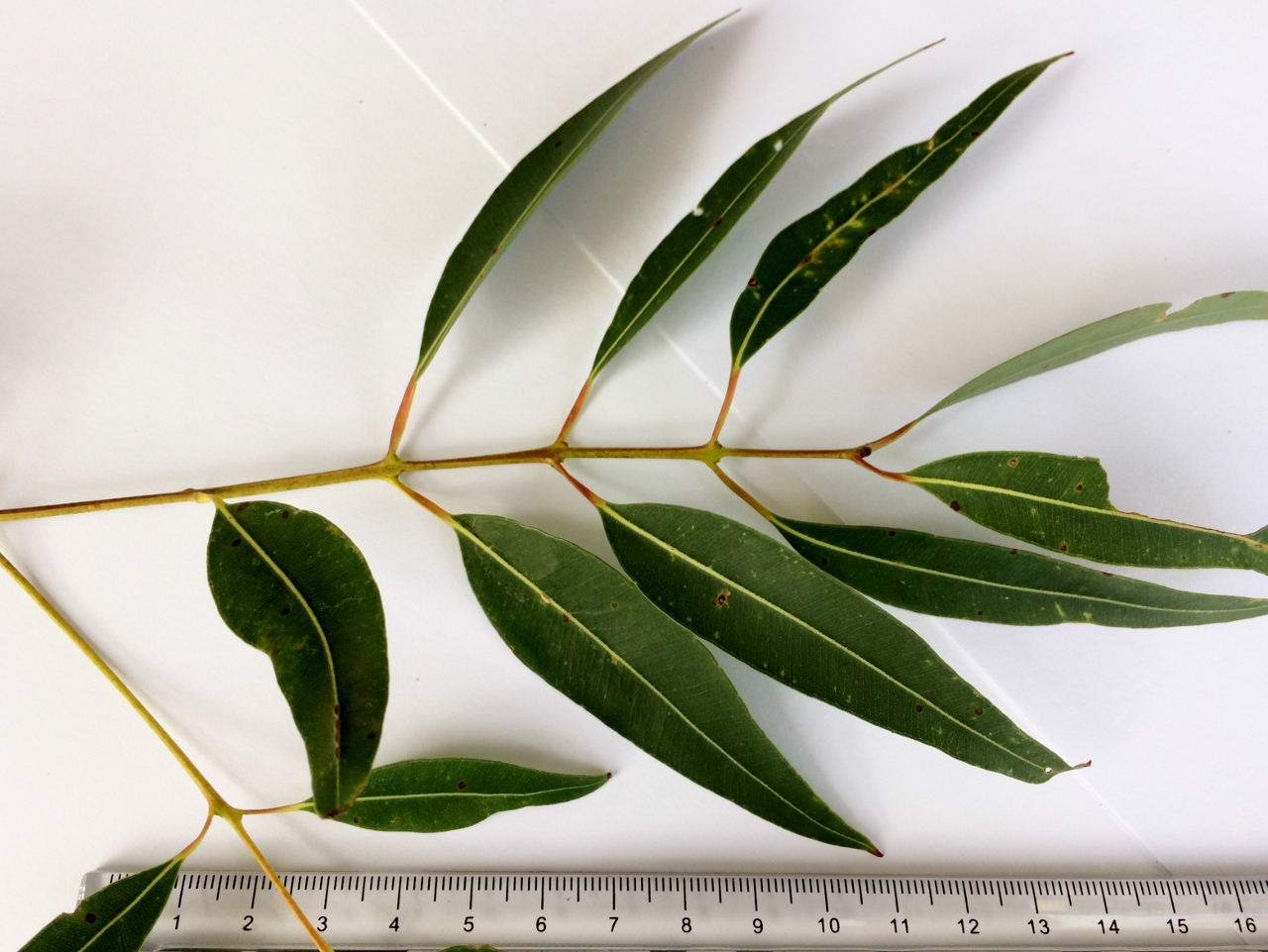
Adult leaves

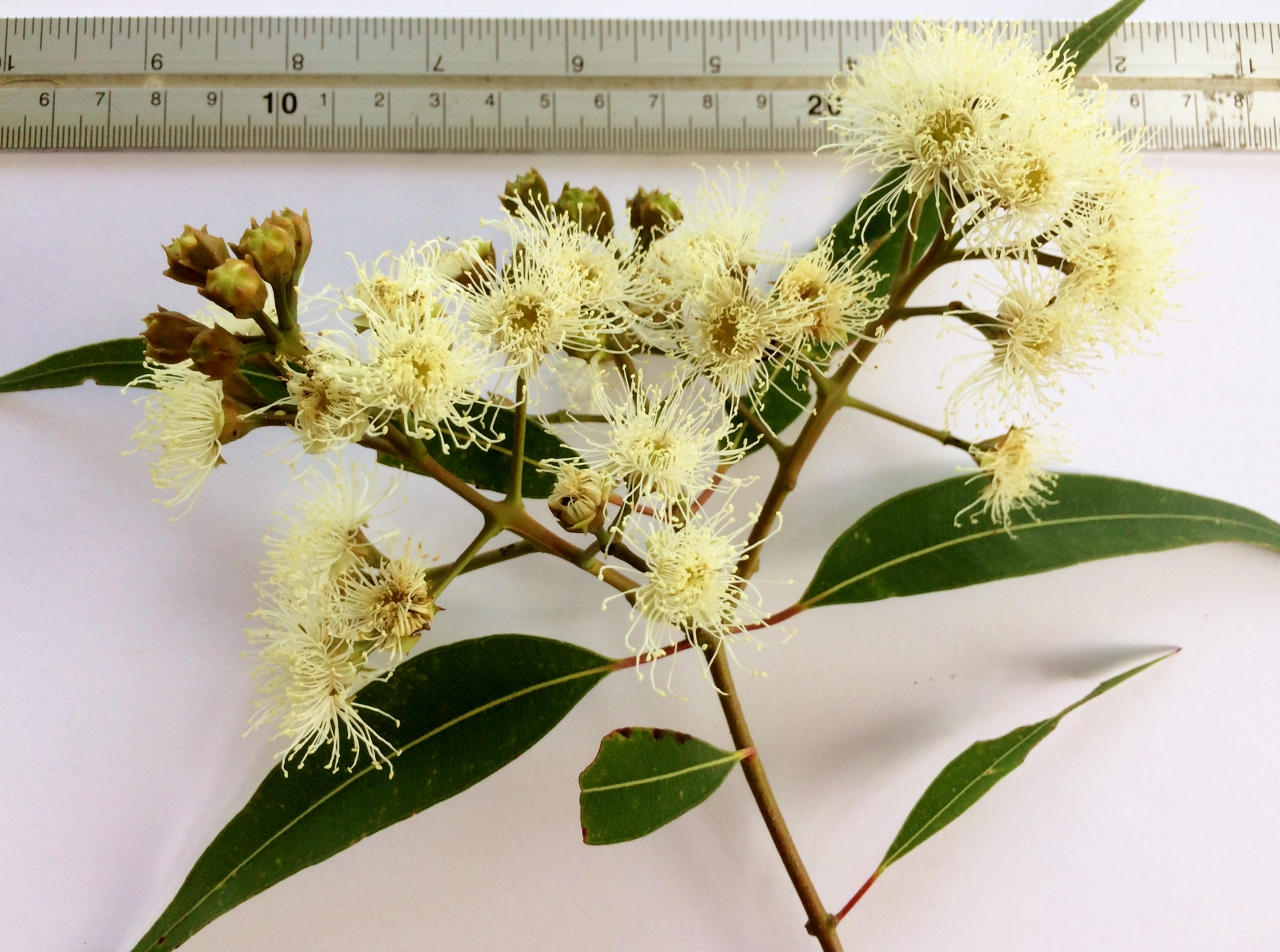
Inflorescence

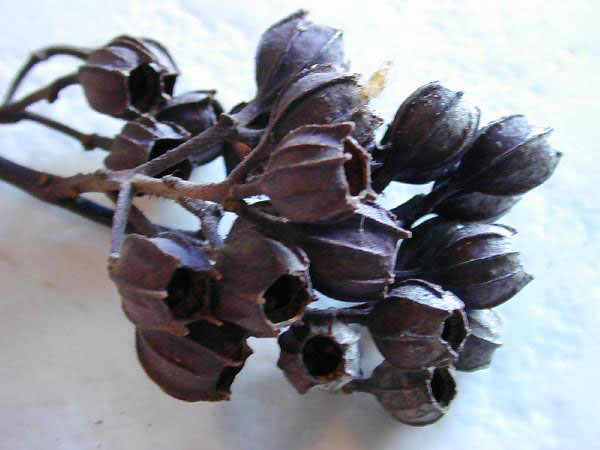
Fruit with ridges

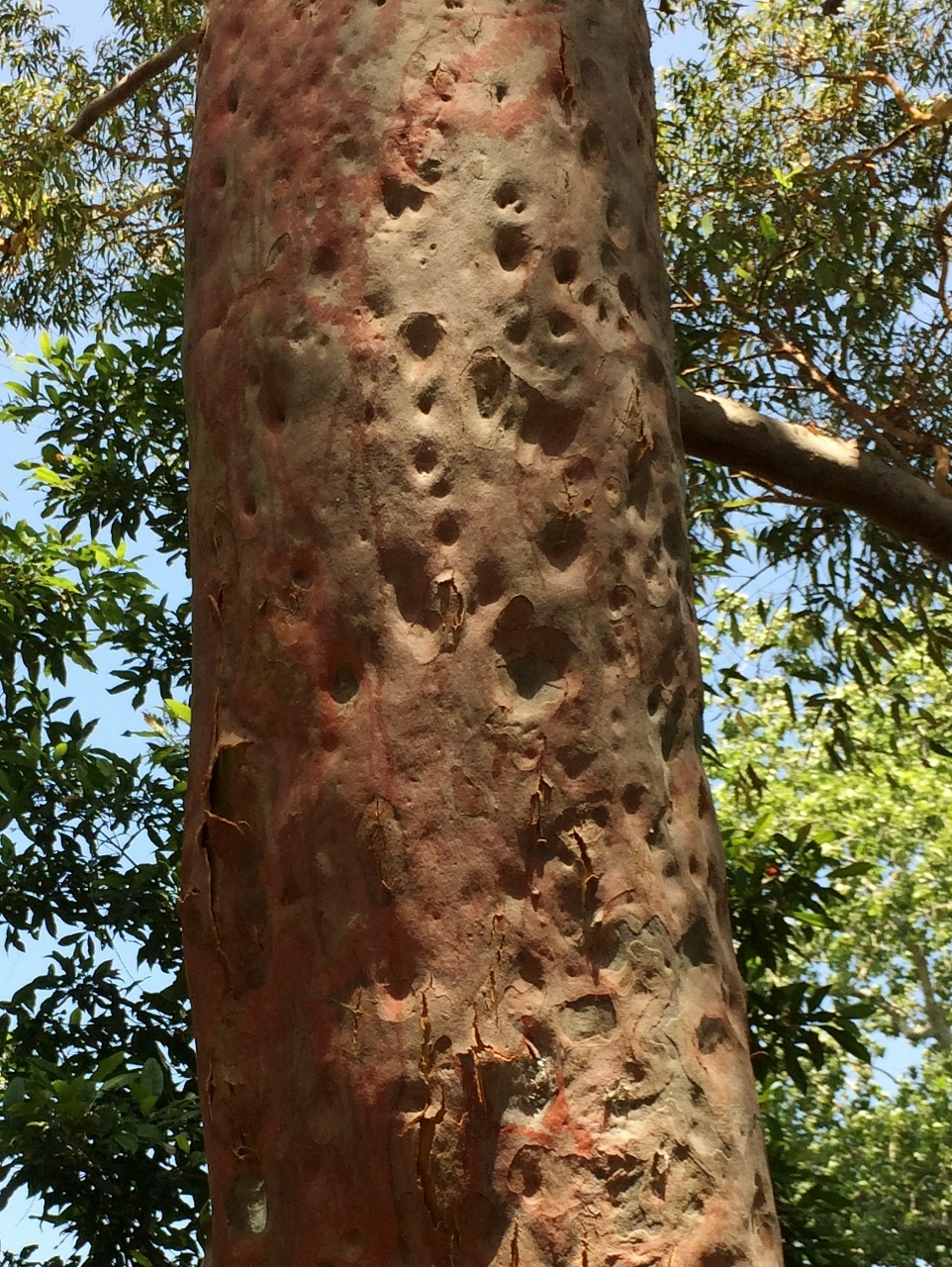
Trunk bark

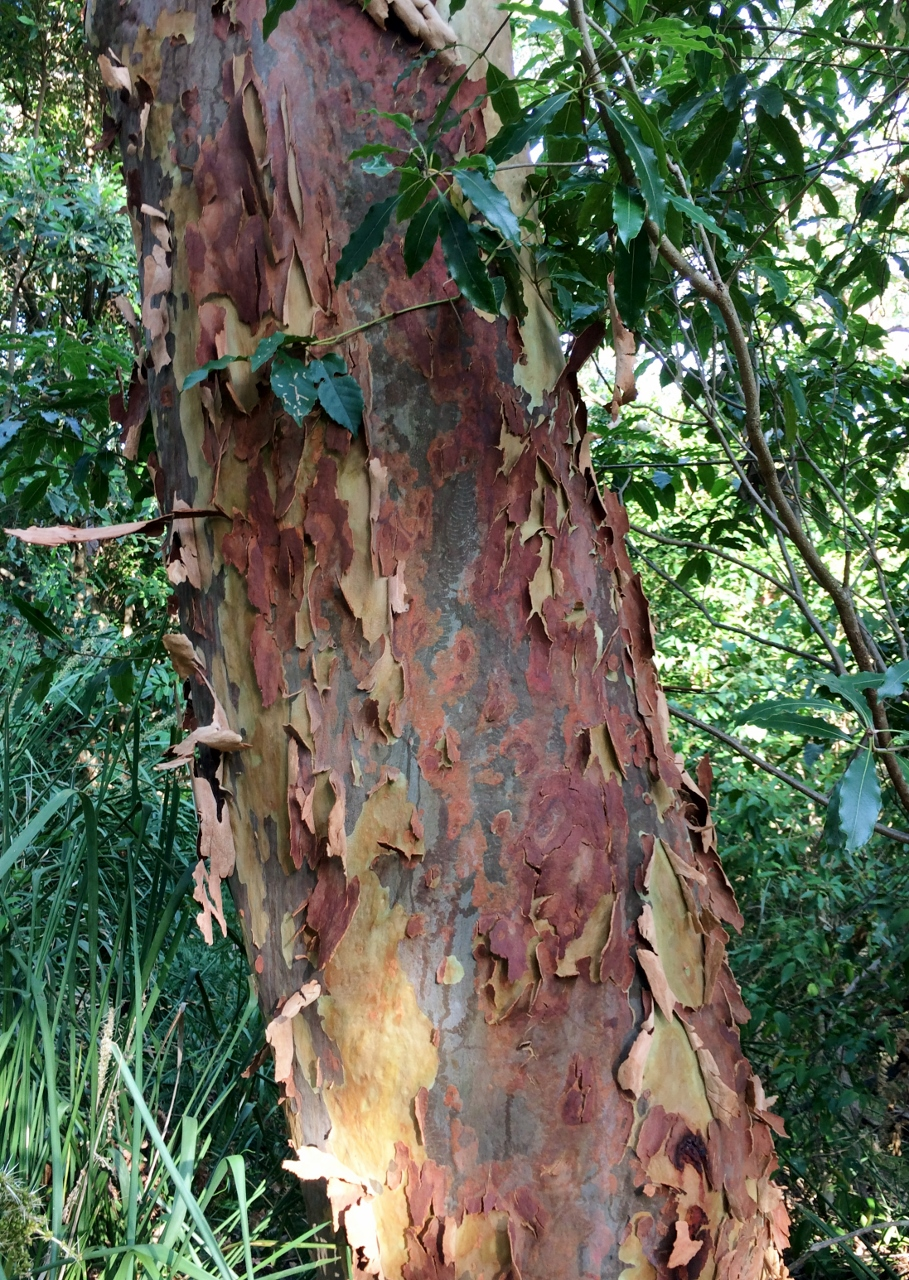
Shedding trunk bark

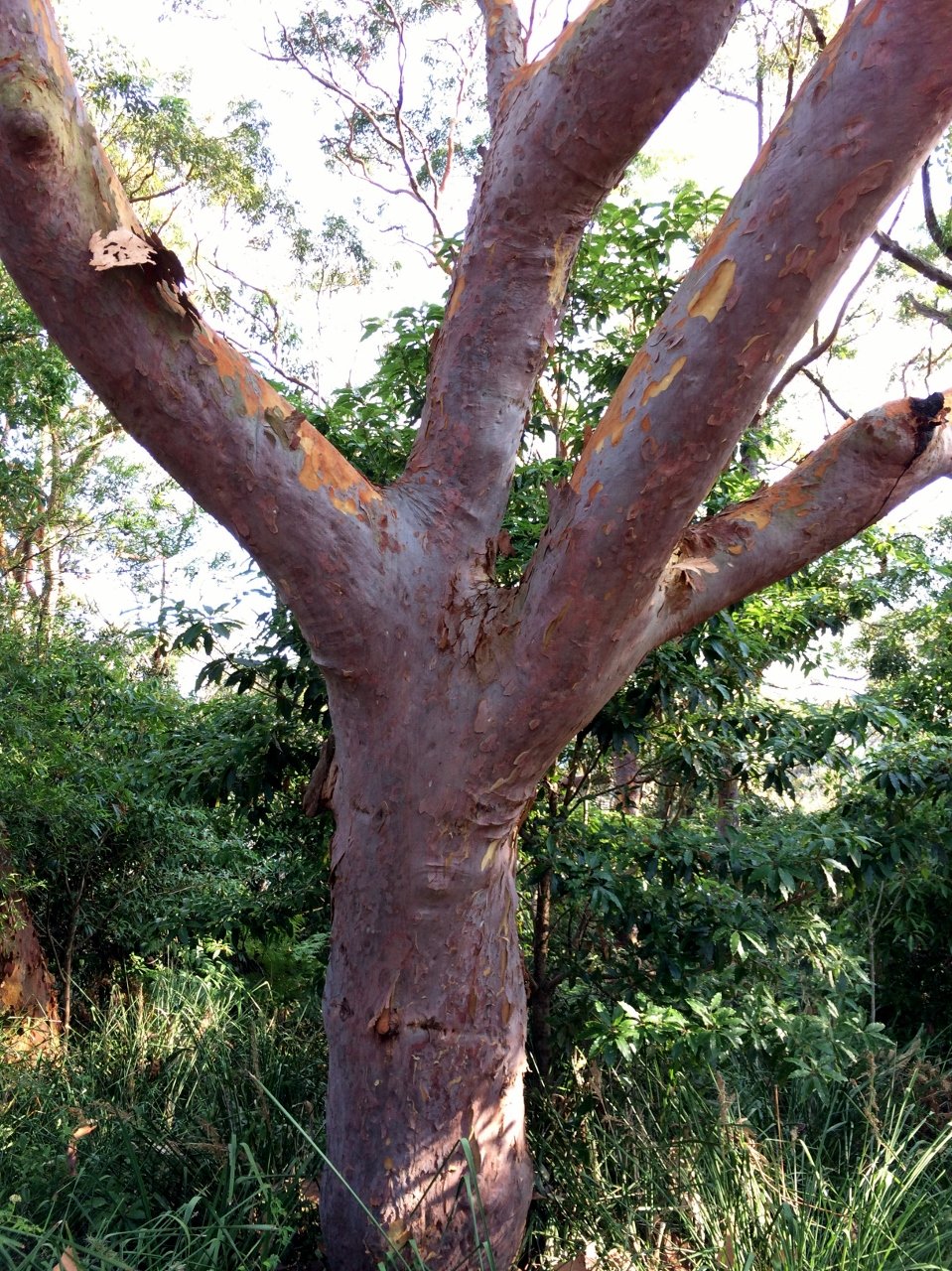
Upper trunk

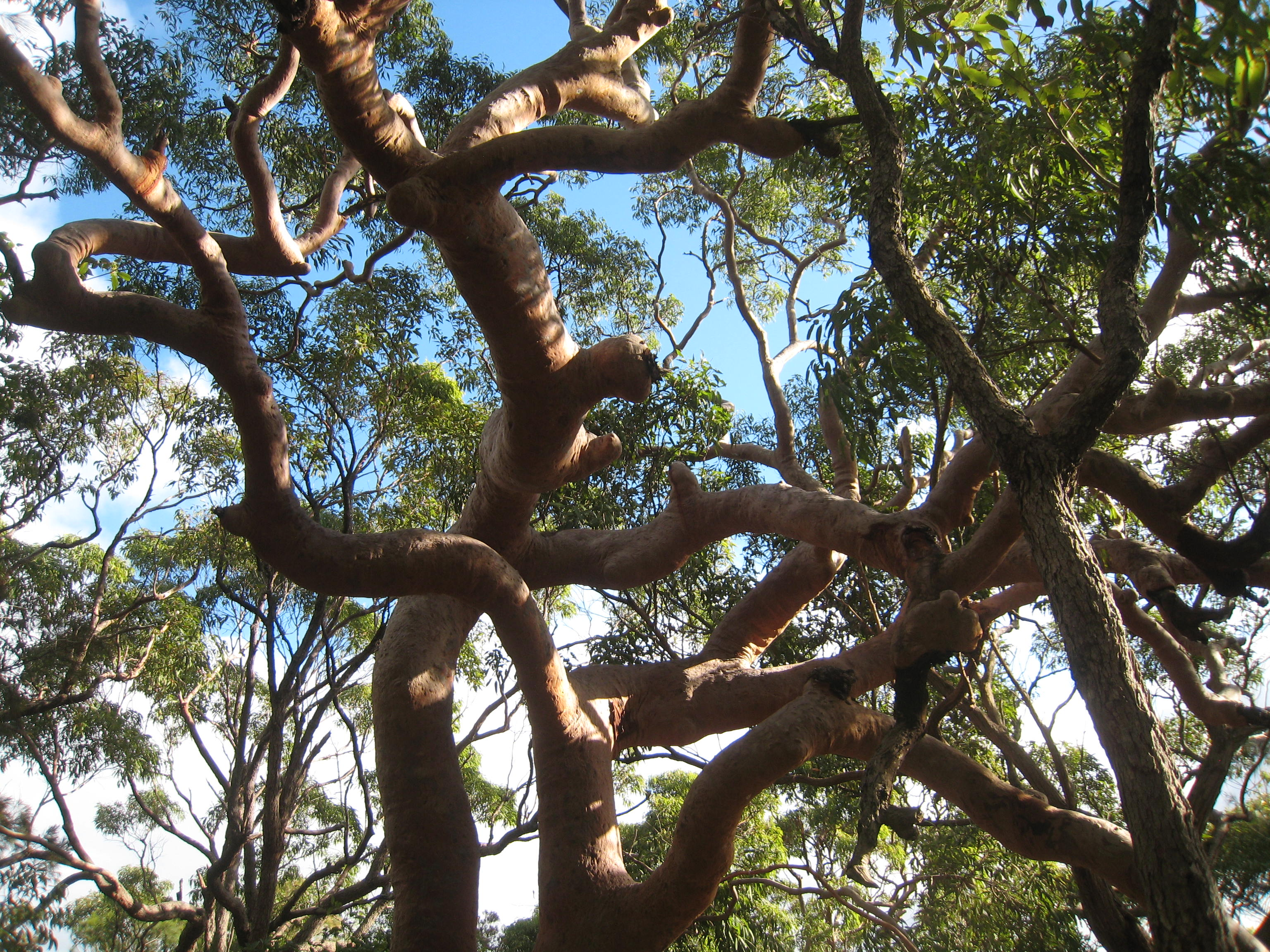
Twisting habit
