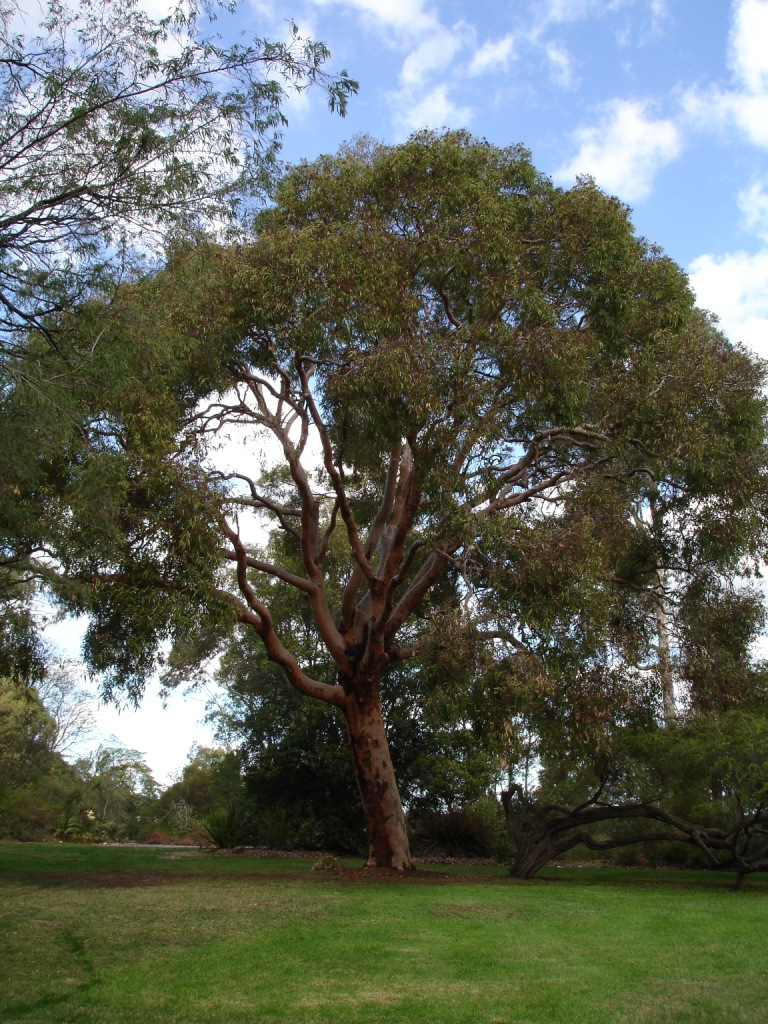
- Angophora costata

Scientific classification
- Kingdom: Plantae
- Clade: Tracheophytes
- Clade: Angiosperms
- Clade: Eudicots
- Clade: Rosids
- Order: Myrtales
- Family: Myrtaceae
- Subfamily: Myrtoideae
- Tribe: Eucalypteae
- Genus: Angophora; Cav.

Species
- See text

= Angophora =

Genus of flowering plants

Angophora is a genus of nine species of trees and shrubs in the myrtle family, Myrtaceae. Endemic to eastern Australia, they differ from other eucalypts in having juvenile and adult leaves arranged in opposite pairs, sepals reduced to projections on the edge of the floral cup, four or five overlapping, more or less round petals, and a papery or thin, woody, often strongly ribbed capsule. Species are found between the Atherton Tableland in Queensland and south through New South Wales to eastern Victoria, Australia.

== Description ==
Plants in the genus Angophora are trees, occasionally shrubs, with rough bark except for A. costata. The juvenile leaves differ from adult leaves in being hairy with raised oil glands. Both juvenile and adult leaves are arranged in opposite pairs, the adult leaves usually glabrous and paler on the lower surface. The flower buds are arranged in groups of three or seven. The flower has four or five small sepals, reduced to small projections on the rim of the floral cup. There are four or five more or less round, keeled, overlapping petals and whorls of many creamy white stamens. Unlike in Eucalyptus and Corymbia, the petals and sepals are not fused to form a cap-like operculum. The fruit is a papery or thin, slightly woody, hairy capsule with longitudinal ribs.

== Taxonomy ==
The genus Angophora was first formally described in 1797 by Antonio José Cavanilles in his book Icones et Descriptiones Plantarum.

Angophora is closely related to Corymbia and Eucalyptus, and all three genera are often referred to as "eucalypts". Collectively the eucalypts dominate many Australian ecosystems. Taxonomists have long recognised the relationships between the eucalypt taxa, but have not agreed upon a classification scheme. Some have proposed merging Angophora and Corymbia into genus Eucalyptus as subgenera, a plan which was immediately rejected by others. Some authors maintain Angophora as a genus, while others continue to debate the issue.

Among the eucalypts, Angophora species were nicknamed "apples" by European settlers, who thought they resembled apple trees. Many are still known commonly as apples today.

== Species ==
The following is a list species of accepted by the Australian Plant Census as at March 2020:

- Angophora bakeri E.C.Hall - NSW
  - Angophora bakeri E.C.Hall subsp. bakeri - NSW
  - Angophora bakeri subsp. crassifolia G.J.Leach - NSW
- Angophora costata (Gaertn.) Britten – Qld, NSW
  - Angophora costata (Gaertn.) Britten subsp. costata – Qld, NSW
  - Angophora costata subsp. euryphylla L.A.S.Johnson ex G.J.Leach – NSW
- Angophora floribunda (Sm.) Sweet - Qld, NSW, Vic.
- Angophora hispida (Sm.) Blaxell - NSW
- Angophora inopina K.D.Hill - NSW
- Angophora leiocarpa (L.A.S.Johnson ex G.J.Leach) K.R.Thiele & Ladiges - NSW, Qld.
- Angophora melanoxylon R.T.Baker - Qld., NSW
- Angophora robur L.A.SJohnson & K.D.Hill - NSW
- Angophora subvelutina F.Muell. - NSW
- Angophora woodsiana F.M.Bailey - Qld., NSW

== Distribution ==
Angophoras are found in coastal Queensland, New South Wales and Victoria from the Atherton Tableland to eastern Victoria.

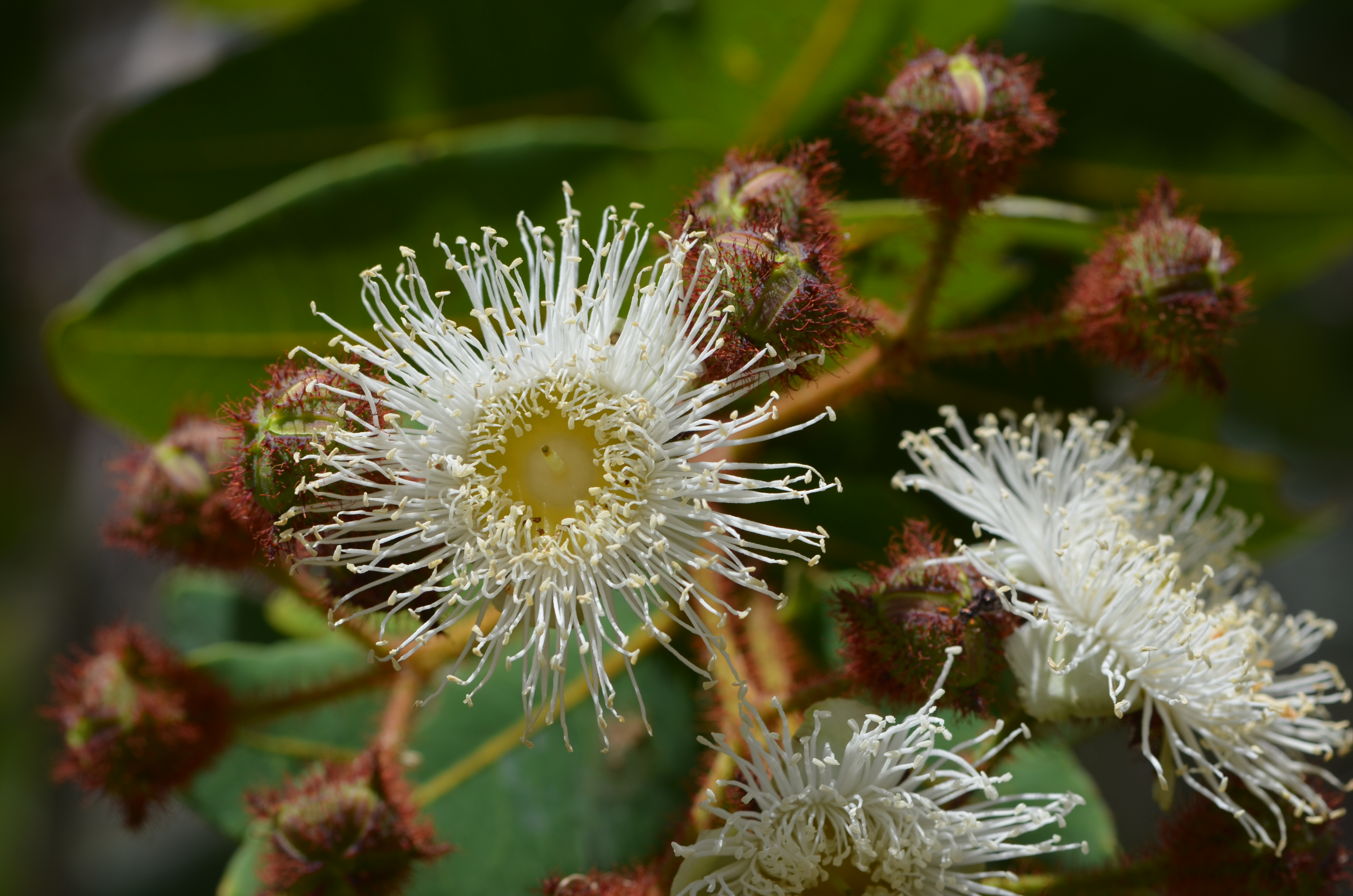
A. hispida buds & flowers

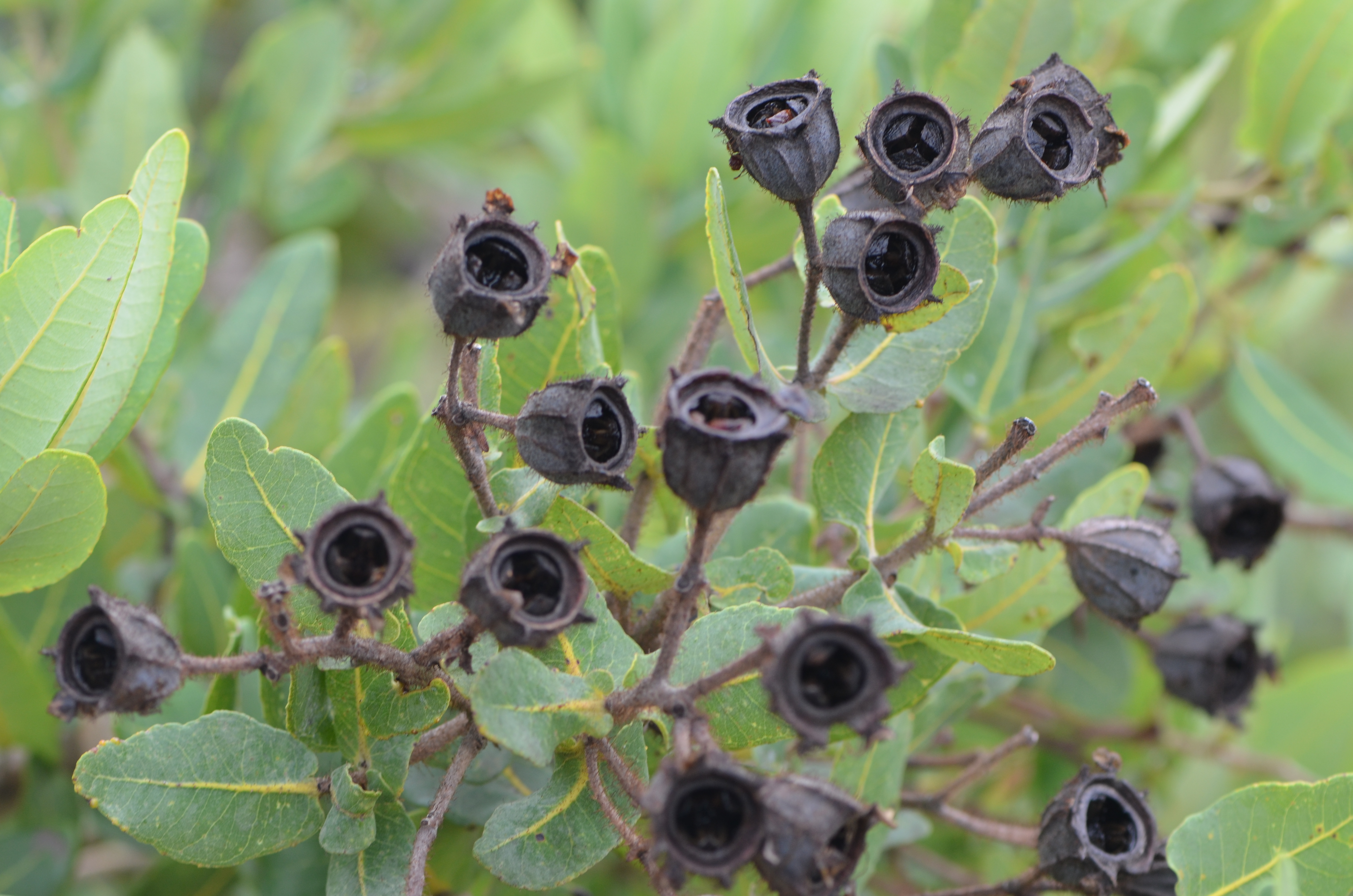
A. hispida fruit

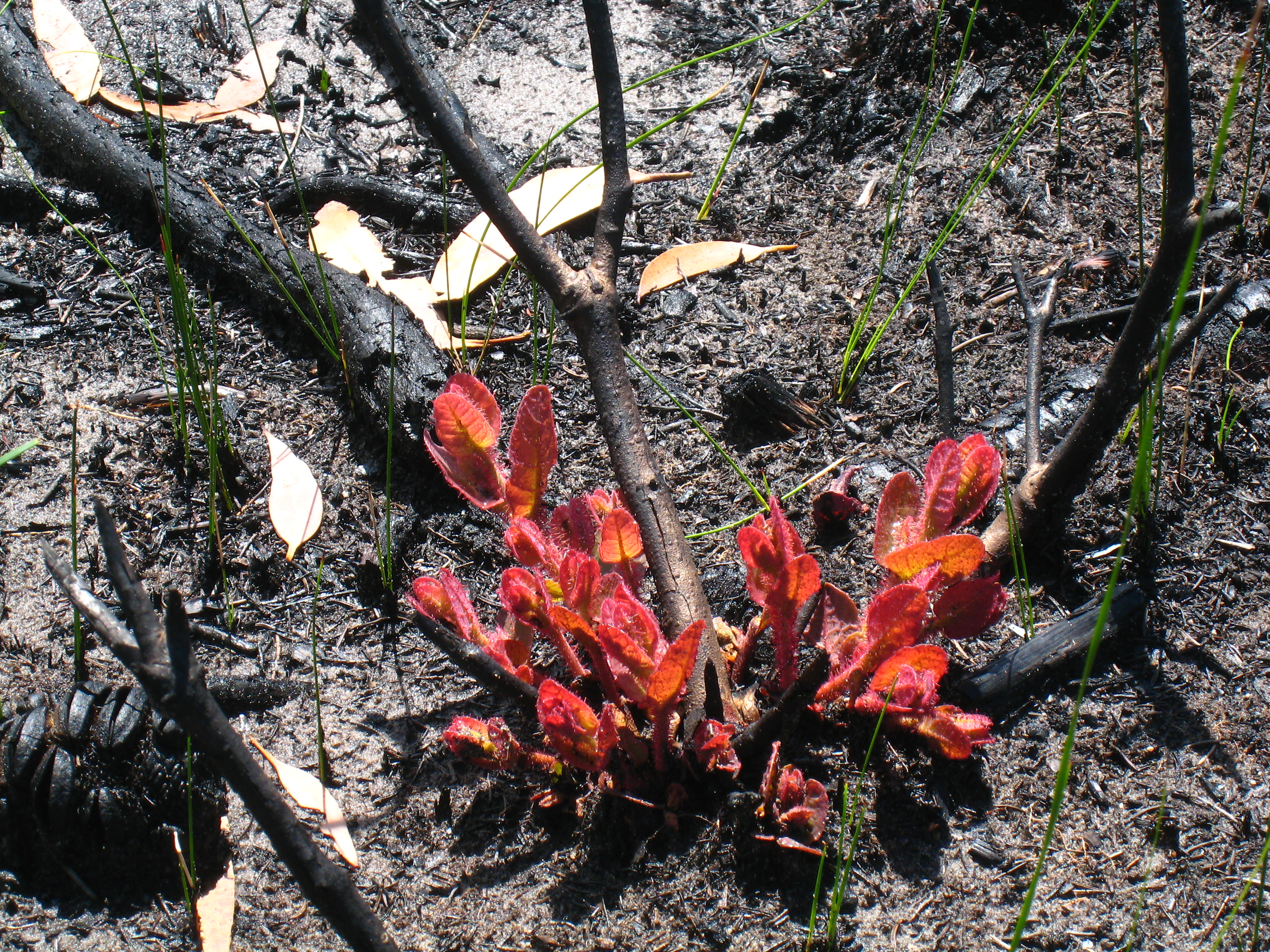
A. hispida lignotuber regrowth after fire

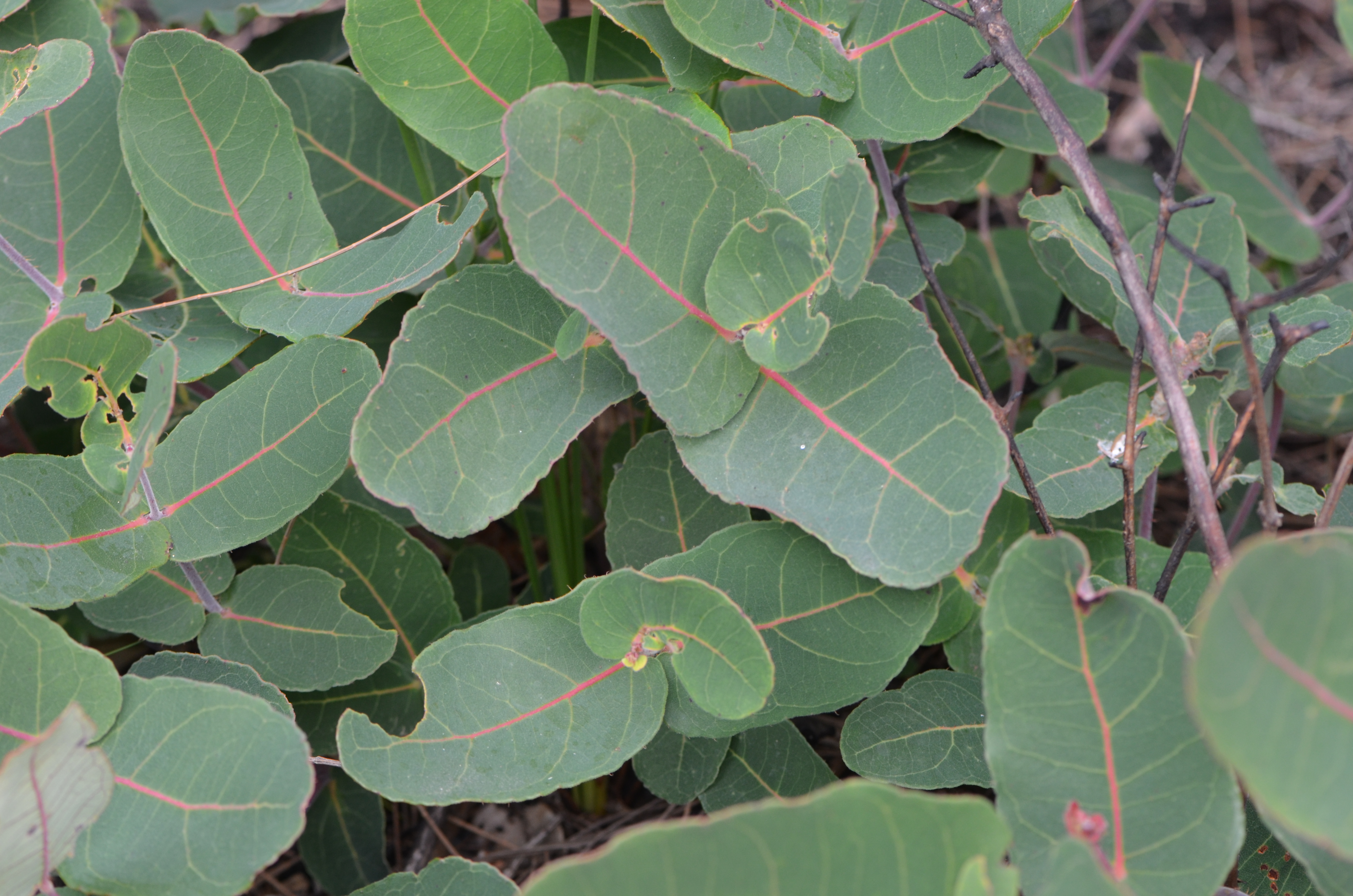
A. hispida opposite and decussate leaves
