= Angophora costata subsp. euryphylla =

Scientific classification
- Kingdom: Plantae
- Clade: Tracheophytes
- Clade: Angiosperms
- Clade: Eudicots
- Clade: Rosids
- Order: Myrtales
- Family: Myrtaceae
- Genus: Angophora
- Species: A. costata
- Subspecies: A. c. subsp. euryphylla

Trinomial name
- Angophora costata subsp. euryphylla L.A.S.Johnson ex G.J.Leach

Synonyms
- Angophora euryphylla (G.J.Leach) L.A.S.Johnson & K.D.Hill; Eucalyptus euryphylla (L.A.S.Johnson ex G.J.Leach) Brooker

Subspecies of tree

Angophora costata subsp. euryphylla is a species of medium-sized to large tree that is endemic to a restricted area of New South Wales. It has smooth bark, lance-shaped adult leaves, flower buds in groups of three, white or creamy white flowers and cylindrical to barrel-shaped fruit. It is similar to subspecies costata but has broader leaves and larger fruit.

== Description ==
Angophora costata subsp. euryphylla is a tree that typically grows to a height of 25 m (82 ft) and forms a lignotuber. It has smooth pinkish to orange bark that weathers to grey. Young plants and coppice regrowth have sessile leaves with a stem-clasping base that are egg-shaped, 60–130 mm (2.4–5.1 in) long, 40–55 mm (1.6–2.2 in) wide and arranged in opposite pairs. Adult leaves are also arranged in opposite pairs, glossy green above and paler below, lance-shaped or curved, 100–210 mm (3.9–8.3 in) long and 20–50 mm (0.79–1.97 in) wide on a petiole 10–25 mm (0.39–0.98 in) long. The flower buds are arranged on the ends of branches on a branched peduncle 17–25 mm (0.67–0.98 in) long, each branch of the peduncle usually with three buds on pedicels 8–15 mm (0.31–0.59 in) long. Mature buds are globe-shaped, 6–10 mm (0.24–0.39 in) long and 6–11 mm (0.24–0.43 in) wide, the floral cup hairy with longitudinal ribs. The sepals are up to 3 mm (0.12 in) long. The petals are white with a green keel and 6–10 mm (0.24–0.39 in) long, 6–11 mm (0.24–0.43 in) wide. Flowering has been observed in November. The fruit is a cylindrical to barrel-shaped capsule 14–20 mm (0.55–0.79 in) long and 12–20 mm (0.47–0.79 in) wide on a pedicel 7–17 mm (0.28–0.67 in) long.

== Taxonomy and naming ==
Metrosideros costata was first formally described in 1788 by Joseph Gaertner. In 1916 James Britten changed the name to Angophora costata and in 1986 Gregory John Leach described three subspecies, including subspecies euryphylla. The type specimens were collected near Putty in 1971. The epithet (euryphylla) is from ancient Greek words meaning "broad" and "leaf".

== Distribution and habitat ==
This eucalypt subspecies is restricted to rocky sandstone outcrops in open forest near Putty, in the Howes Valley and Judge Dowling Range.
