= Angophora costata subsp. costata =

Scientific classification
- Kingdom: Plantae
- Clade: Tracheophytes
- Clade: Angiosperms
- Clade: Eudicots
- Clade: Rosids
- Order: Myrtales
- Family: Myrtaceae
- Genus: Angophora
- Species: A. costata
- Subspecies: A. c. subsp. costata

Trinomial name
- Angophora costata subsp. costata (Gaertn.) Britten

Synonyms
- Angophora lanceolata Cav. nom. illeg., nom. superfl.; Angophora lanceolata var. hispida A.Gray; Angophora lanceolata Cav. var. lanceolata; Eucalyptus apocynifolia (Salisb.) Brooker; Melaleuca costata Raeusch. nom. inval., nom. nud.; Metrosideros apocynifolia Salisb.; Metrosideros lanceolata Pers. nom. illeg., nom. superfl.; Metrosideros splendens Gaertn. ex DC. nom. illeg.

Subspecies of tree

Angophora costata subsp. costata is a species of medium-sized to large tree that is endemic to eastern Australia. It has smooth bark, lance-shaped adult leaves, flower buds in groups of three, white or creamy white flowers and cylindrical to barrel-shaped fruit. It is similar to subspecies costata but has narrower leaves and smaller fruit.

== Description ==
Angophora costata subsp. costata is a tree that typically grows to a height of 30 m (98 ft) and forms a lignotuber. It has smooth pinkish to orange bark that weathers to grey. Young plants and coppice regrowth have sessile leaves with a stem-clasping base that are elliptical to egg-shaped, 60–125 mm (2.4–4.9 in) long, 20–65 mm (0.79–2.56 in) wide and arranged in opposite pairs. Adult leaves are also arranged in opposite pairs, glossy green above and paler below, lance-shaped or curved, 70–190 mm (2.8–7.5 in) long and 12–35 mm (0.47–1.38 in) wide on a petiole 9–25 mm (0.35–0.98 in) long. The flower buds are arranged on the ends of branches on a branched peduncle 3–20 mm (0.12–0.79 in) long, each branch of the peduncle usually with three buds on pedicels 3–8 mm (0.12–0.31 in) long. Mature buds are globe-shaped, 4–8 mm (0.16–0.31 in) long and 5–7 mm (0.20–0.28 in) wide, the floral cup glabrous with longitudinal ribs. The sepals are up to 3 mm (0.12 in) long. The petals are white with a green keel and 3–4 mm (0.12–0.16 in) long and wide. Flowering occurs from October to December. The fruit is a cylindrical to barrel-shaped capsule 10–18 mm (0.39–0.71 in) long and 9–17 mm (0.35–0.67 in) wide on a pedicel 2–12 mm (0.079–0.472 in) long.

== Taxonomy and naming ==
Metrosideros costata was first formally described in 1788 by Joseph Gaertner. In 1916 James Britten changed the name to Angophora costata and in 1986 Gregory John Leach described three subspecies, including subspecies costata.

== Distribution and habitat ==
This eucalypt subspecies grows in sandy soil, often over sandstone and occurs naturally in Queensland and New South Wales. It is widely distributed in south-eastern Queensland and disjunctly in the White Mountains National Park. In New South Wales it mainly occurs in coastal areas south from Coffs Harbour to Narooma and as far west as the Blue Mountains. In Victoria it is a commonly planted ornamental and is naturalised in some places.
