= Acacia tolmerensis =

Scientific classification
- Kingdom: Plantae
- Clade: Tracheophytes
- Clade: Angiosperms
- Clade: Eudicots
- Clade: Rosids
- Order: Fabales
- Family: Fabaceae
- Subfamily: Caesalpinioideae
- Clade: Mimosoid clade
- Genus: Acacia
- Species: A. tolmerensis

Binomial name
- Acacia tolmerensis G.J.Leach
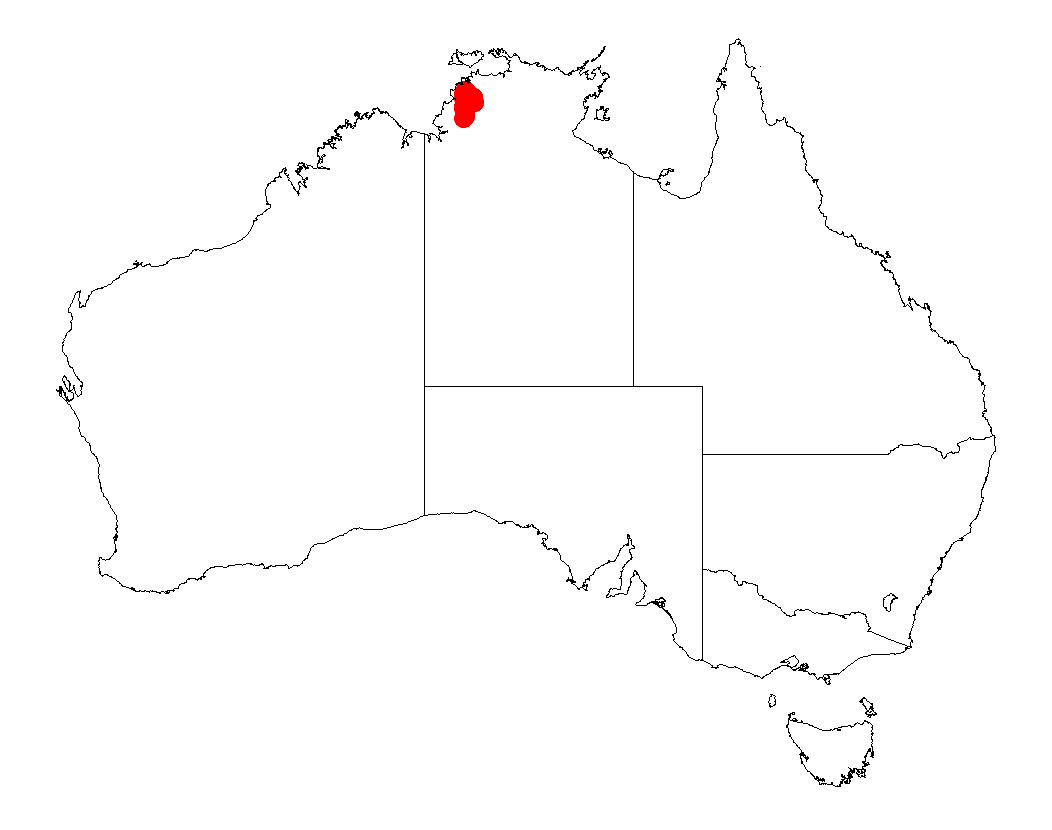
- Occurrence data from AVH

Species of legume

Acacia is a shrub or tree of the genus Acacia and the subgenus Plurinerves that is endemic to an area of northern Australia.

== Description ==
The shrub or less frequently tree typically grows to a height of 1 to 4 m (3 ft 3 in to 13 ft 1 in) and has a glabrous and multi-stemmed habit that will often sucker following fires. It has prominently flattened branchlet that are angular towards the tips and covered in a fine white powdery coating. Like most species of Acacia it has phyllodes rather than true leaves. The evergreen, thinly leathery, grey-green phyllodes have a dimidiately elliptic shape and are slightly recurved with a length of 11 to 24.5 cm (4.3 to 9.6 in) and a width of 4 to 9 mm (0.16 to 0.35 in) and have three to four, or sometimes six primary longitudinal nerves. It blooms between November and February and produces racemose inflorescences with spherical flower-heads that have a diameter of 7 to 11 mm (0.28 to 0.43 in) containing about 80 densely packed creamy white to pale yellow coloured flowers. Following flowering leathery to sub-woody seed pods form that are flat with a length of 5 to 11 cm (2.0 to 4.3 in) and a width of 2 to 3 mm (0.079 to 0.118 in). The brown coloured seeds inside have a flattened elliptic shape with a length of 8 to 10 mm (0.31 to 0.39 in) and a terminal aril.

== Taxonomy ==
The species was first formally described by the botanist G.J.Leach in 1994 as a part of the work Notes and new species of Acacia (Mimosaceae) from northern Australia as published in the journal Nuytsia. It was reclassified as Racosperma tolmerense by Leslie Pedley in 2003 then transferred back to genus Acacia in 2006.

== Distribution ==
It is native to a small area of the western side of the top end of the Northern Territory from the Tabletop Range in the north to around the Daly River in the south growing in sandy soils as a part of open forest communities.

== See also ==
- List of Acacia species
