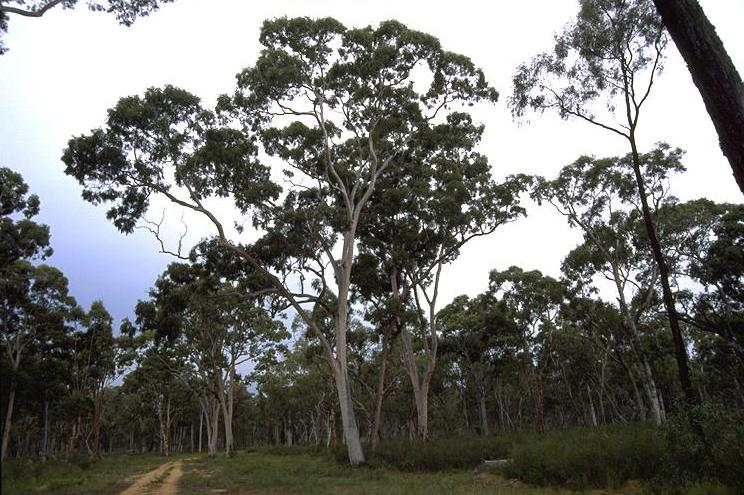
- In the Pilliga Nature Reserve

Conservation status
- Least Concern (IUCN 3.1)

Scientific classification
- Kingdom: Plantae
- Clade: Tracheophytes
- Clade: Angiosperms
- Clade: Eudicots
- Clade: Rosids
- Order: Myrtales
- Family: Myrtaceae
- Genus: Angophora
- Species: A. leiocarpa

Binomial name
- Angophora leiocarpa (L.A.S.Johnson ex G.J.Leach) K.R.Thiele & Ladiges
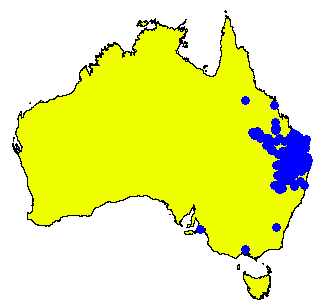
- Occurrence data from AVH

Synonyms
- Angophora costata subsp. leiocarpa L.A.S.Johnson ex G.J.Leach; Eucalyptus leiocarpa (L.A.S.Johnson ex G.J.Leach) Brooker

= Angophora leiocarpa =

Rusty gum

Species of tree

Angophora leiocarpa, commonly known as rusty gum, is a species of small to medium-sized tree that is endemic to eastern Australia. It has smooth bark on the trunk and branches, lance-shaped adult leaves, flower buds usually in groups of three, white or creamy white flowers and smooth barrel-shaped to cup-shaped fruit.

== Description ==
Angophora leiocarpa is a tree that typically grows to a height of 25 m (82 ft) and forms a lignotuber. It has smooth pink to orange or greyish bark that is shed in small patches. Young plants and coppice regrowth have sessile leaves that are narrow lance-shaped, 45–140 mm (1.8–5.5 in) long and 7–28 mm (0.3–1.1 in) wide with a stem-clasping base, and arranged in opposite pairs. Adult leaves are also arranged in opposite pairs, lance-shaped or curved, 55–160 mm (2.2–6.3 in) long and 6–25 mm (0.2–1.0 in) wide tapering to a petiole 6–15 mm (0.2–0.6 in) long. The flower buds are arranged on the ends of branchlets on a branched, glabrous peduncle 9–32 mm (0.4–1.3 in) long, each branch of the peduncle with three, rarely seven buds, on pedicels 3–8 mm (0.1–0.3 in) long. Mature buds are globe-shaped, 4–7 mm (0.2–0.3 in) long and 4–6 mm (0.16–0.24 in) wide with a smooth to slightly ribbed floral cup and petals about 3 mm (0.1 in) long and 3–4 mm (0.12–0.16 in) wide. Flowering has been observed from November to February and the fruit is a thin-walled, barrel-shaped to cup-shaped capsule 10–15 mm (0.4–0.6 in) long and 7–12 mm (0.3–0.5 in) wide with the valves enclosed in the fruit.

== Taxonomy and naming ==
Rusty gum was first formally described in 1986 by Gregory John Leach from an unpublished description by Lawrie Johnson and given the name Angophora costata subsp. leiocarpa from specimens collected near Warialda High School in 1976. In 1988 Kevin Thiele and Pauline Ladiges raised it to species status as Angophora leiocarpa. The specific epithet leiocarpa is derived from the ancient Greek leios meaning 'smooth' and karpon 'fruit', distinguishing this Angophora from others in the genus. A 2021 molecular analysis of the genus confirmed it was genetically divergent from the two A. costata subspecies, and in fact showed some hybridization with Angophora floribunda.

== Distribution and habitat ==
Angophora leiocarpa grows in open forest on sandstone hills and outcrops from Blackall and Mackay in Queensland, south to Narrabri and Grafton in New South Wales.

== Gallery ==
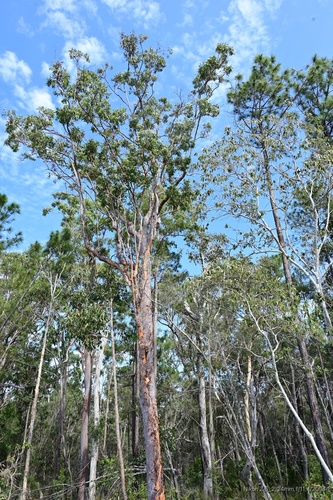
Mature Angophora leiocarpa

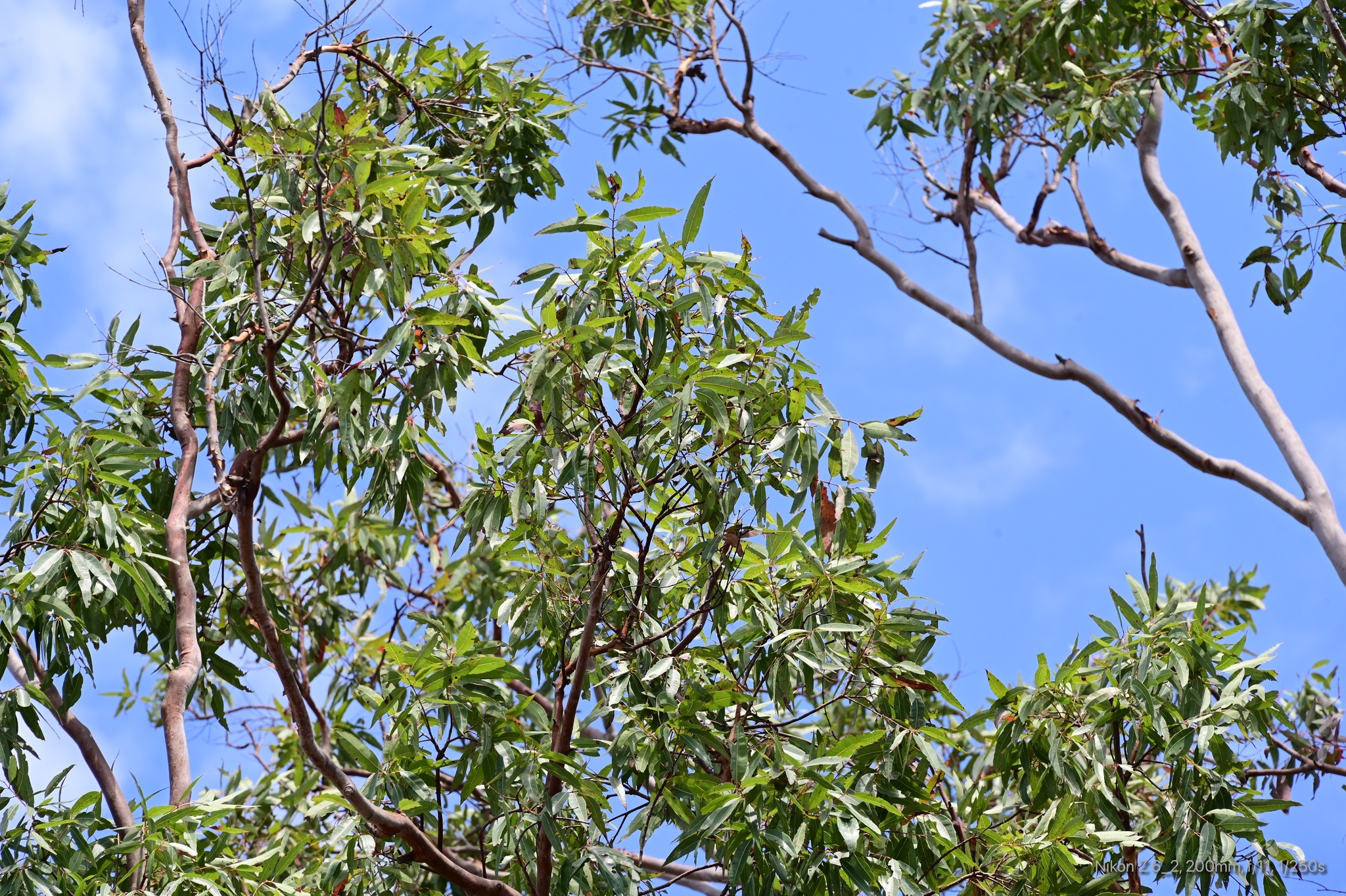
Mature leaves in canopy of an Angophora leiocarpa
