= Syzygium banksii =

Conservation status
- Least Concern (IUCN 3.1)
- Least Concern (NCA)

Scientific classification
- Kingdom: Plantae
- Clade: Tracheophytes
- Clade: Angiosperms
- Clade: Eudicots
- Clade: Rosids
- Order: Myrtales
- Family: Myrtaceae
- Genus: Syzygium
- Species: S. banksii

Binomial name
- Syzygium banksii (Britten & S.Moore) B.Hyland, 1983

Synonyms
- Eugenia banksii Britten & S.Moore, 1902

Species of flowering plant

Syzygium banksii, known commonly as Joseph's satinash, is a species of flowering plant in the family Myrtaceae that is endemic to Queensland in Australia.

== Description ==
This species grows as a tree to a height of 26 metres. The species has a perennial life cycle and is hermaphroditic. The flowering time of this species is from July to October and the fruiting time is in November and December. The fruit is fleshy, indehiscent, baccate or drupaceous. The species is evergreen.

== Habitat and distribution ==
The species is restricted to tropical rainforest and wet monsoon forest in or around the Cape York Peninsula of Queensland in Australia.

== Conservation ==
Under the Nature Conservation Act 1992 in Queensland it has been classified as Least Concern. The IUCN Red List also assesses the species as Least Concern.
