= Acacia echinuliflora =

Scientific classification
- Kingdom: Plantae
- Clade: Tracheophytes
- Clade: Angiosperms
- Clade: Eudicots
- Clade: Rosids
- Order: Fabales
- Family: Fabaceae
- Subfamily: Caesalpinioideae
- Clade: Mimosoid clade
- Genus: Acacia
- Species: A. echinuliflora

Binomial name
- Acacia echinuliflora G.J.Leach
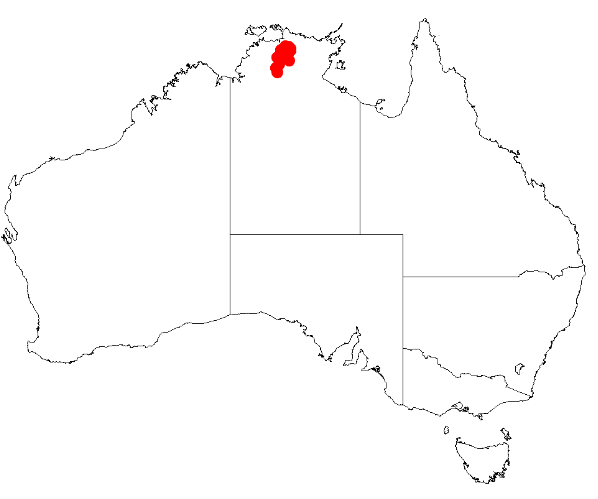
- Occurrence data from AVH

Synonyms
- Racosperma echinuliflorum (G.J.Leach)Pedley

Species of legume

Acacia echinuliflora is a species of flowering plant in the family Fabaceae and is endemic to the north of the Northern Territory in Australia. It is a tree, rarely a shrub, with fibrous or shaggy brown to black bark, narrowly elliptic or lance-shaped phyllodes, spikes of bright to golden yellow flowers, and linear to oblong pods raised over the seeds.

== Description ==
Acacia echinuliflora is a tree, rarely a shrub, that typically grows to a height of 4–8 m (13–26 ft) and has fibrous or shaggy brown to black bark. Its branchlets are terete, reddish brown and resinous. Its phyllodes are narrowly elliptic or lance-shaped with the narrower end towards the base, 90–185 mm (3.5–7.3 in) long and 6–14 mm (0.24–0.55 in) wide, thinly leathery, glabrous and shiny. The flowers are borne in one or two spikes 50–70 mm (2.0–2.8 in) long and are bright to golden yellow. Flowering occurs from June to August and the pods are linear to oblong, straw-coloured, 24–54 mm (0.94–2.13 in) long and 7–9 mm (0.28–0.35 in) wide and raised over the seeds alternately on each side. The seeds are oblong or elliptic, brown or black, 2.7–3.8 mm (0.11–0.15 in) long and 1.8–2.5 mm (0.071–0.098 in) wide with a folded aril.

== Taxonomy ==
Acacia echinuliflora was first formally described in 1994 by Gregory John Leach in the journal Nuytsia from specimens collected in Bower Bird Billabong in Kakadu National Park in 1984. The specific epithet (echinuliflora) "refers to the bristly appearance the flowers".

== Distribution ==
This species of wattle is endemic to the Northern Territory where it is commonly found along the escarpments in the western portion of Arnhem Land in the north, and down to Nitmiluk National Park in the south where it grows in sandy soils in creeks and streams draining the escarpment.

== Conservation status ==
Acacia echinuliflora is listed as of "least concern" under the Northern Territory Government Territory Parks Wildlife Conservation Act.

== See also ==
- List of Acacia species
