= Angophora inopina =

Charmhaven apple

Conservation status
- Near Threatened (IUCN 3.1)

Scientific classification
- Kingdom: Plantae
- Clade: Tracheophytes
- Clade: Angiosperms
- Clade: Eudicots
- Clade: Rosids
- Order: Myrtales
- Family: Myrtaceae
- Genus: Angophora
- Species: A. inopina

Binomial name
- Angophora inopina K.D.Hill

Synonyms
- Eucalyptus inopina (K.D.Hill) Brooker

Species of flowering plant

Angophora inopina, commonly known as the Charmhaven apple, is a species of small, often multi-stemmed tree that is endemic to the Central Coast of New South Wales. It has rough bark on the trunk and branches, lance-shaped adult leaves, flower buds in groups of three or seven, white or creamy white flowers and ribbed, cup-shaped fruit.

== Description ==
Angophora inopina is a tree, often multi-stemmed, that typically grows to a height of 8 m (26 ft) and forms a lignotuber. It has greyish, fibrous bark on the trunk and branches. Young plants and coppice regrowth have more or less sessile, egg-shaped to lance-shaped leaves that are 40–70 mm (1.6–2.8 in) long, 15–30 mm (0.59–1.18 in) wide and arranged in opposite pairs. Adult leaves are also arranged in opposite pairs, leathery, usually glossy green but paler on the lower side, lance-shaped or curved, 45–120 mm (1.8–4.7 in) long and 8–30 mm (0.31–1.18 in) wide on a petiole 4–15 mm (0.16–0.59 in) long. The flower buds are arranged on the ends of branchlets in groups of three or seven on a bristly, branched peduncle 3–27 mm (0.12–1.06 in) long, the individual buds on pedicels 7–12 mm (0.28–0.47 in) long. Mature buds are globe-shaped, 5–7 mm (0.20–0.28 in) long and wide with white or creamy white petals that are 3–4 mm (0.12–0.16 in) long and wide with a green keel. Flowering has been observed in December and the fruit is a bristly, cup-shaped capsule 6–13 mm (0.24–0.51 in) long and 9–15 mm (0.35–0.59 in) wide with longitudinal ribs and the valves enclosed in the fruit.

== Taxonomy and naming ==
Angophora inopina was first formally described in 1997 by Ken Hill from specimens collected near Charmhaven in the same year. The specific epithet (inopina) is from the Latin inopinatus, meaning "unexpected", referring to the occurrence of this previously undescribed species near Sydney.

== Distribution and habitat ==
Charmhaven apple grows sandy soil over sandstone in woodland with a dense, shrubby understorey. It has a patchy distribution from Lake Macquarie to near the Hunter River and is most common in the Wyong and Lake Macquarie local government areas.

== Conservation status ==
This eucalypt is listed as "vulnerable" under the Australian Government Environment Protection and Biodiversity Conservation Act 1999 and the New South Wales Government Threatened Species Conservation Act 1995. The main threats to the species are habitat loss and fragmentation, changes to the water table, frequent fires, trampling and competition from weeds.
