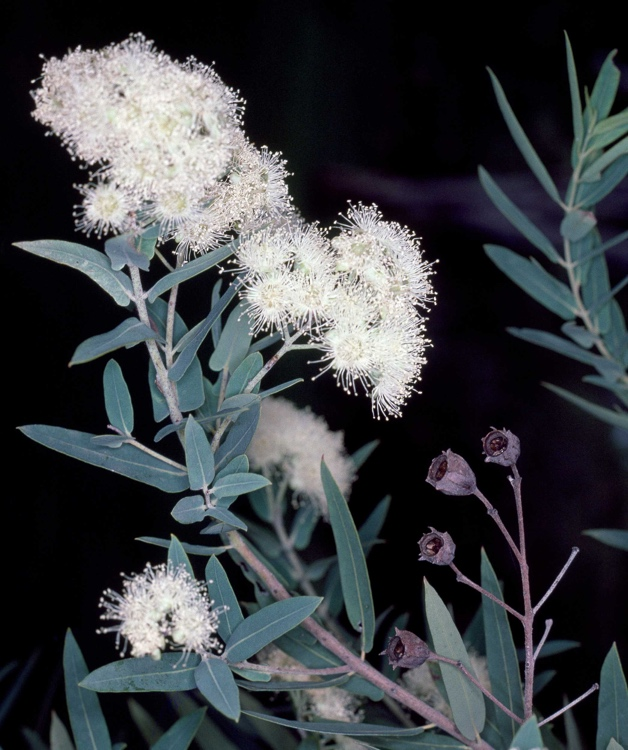
- Flowers and fruit in the ANBG

Conservation status
- Least Concern (IUCN 3.1)

Scientific classification
- Kingdom: Plantae
- Clade: Tracheophytes
- Clade: Angiosperms
- Clade: Eudicots
- Clade: Rosids
- Order: Myrtales
- Family: Myrtaceae
- Genus: Angophora
- Species: A. melanoxylon

Binomial name
- Angophora melanoxylon R.T.Baker
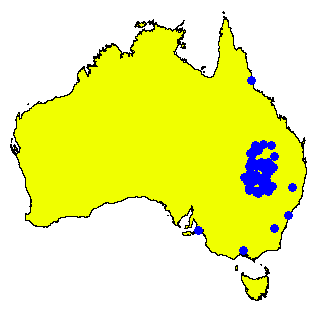
- Occurrence data from AVH

Synonyms
- Angophora intermedia var. melanoxylon (R.T.Baker) Maiden & Betche; Eucalyptus melana Brooker

= Angophora melanoxylon =

Coolabah apple

Species of tree

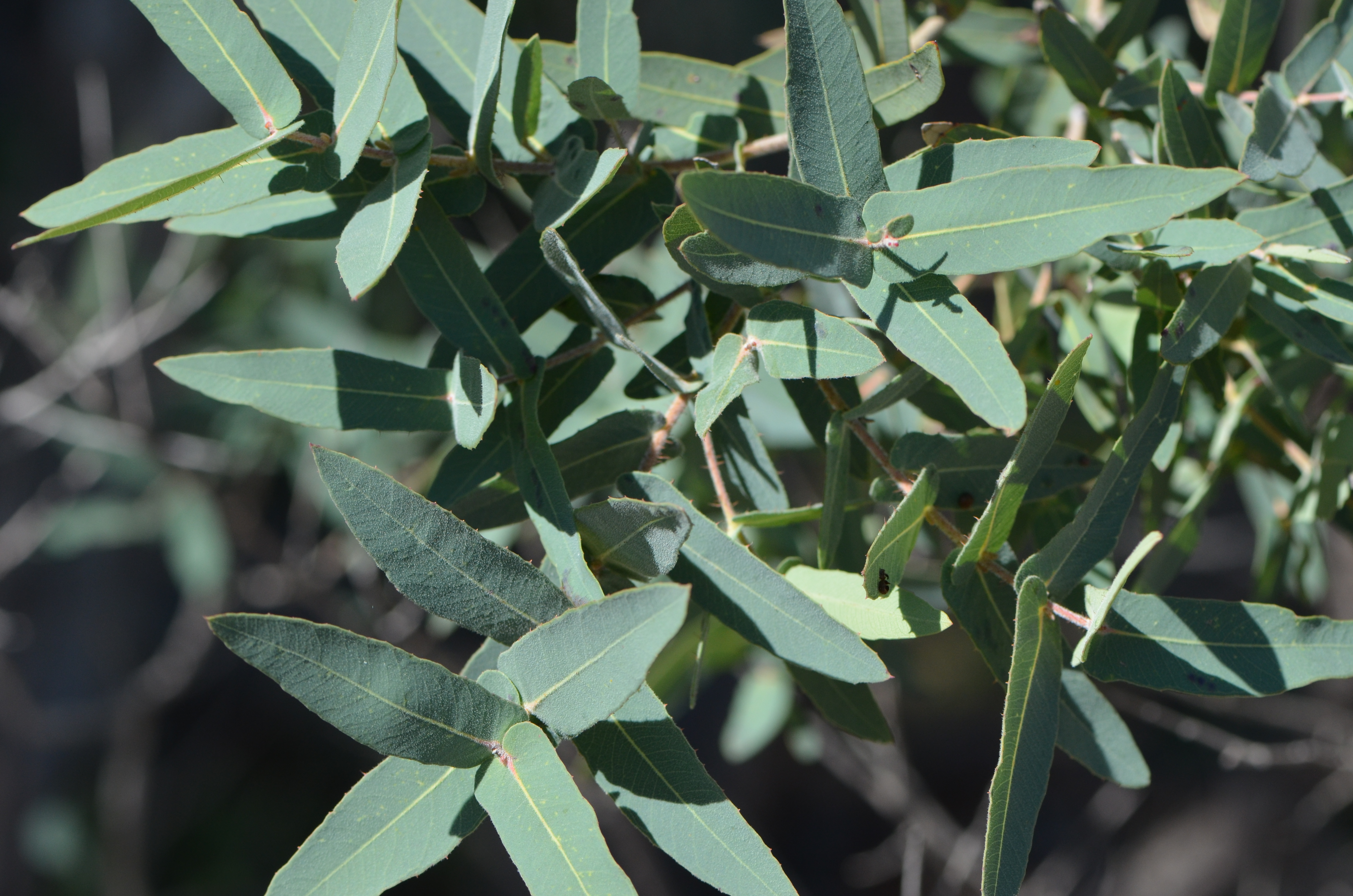
Foliage

Angophora melanoxylon, commonly known as Coolabah apple, is a species of small to medium-sized tree that is endemic to eastern Australia. It has rough, fibrous bark on the trunk and branches, linear to narrow lance-shaped adult leaves, flower buds in groups of three or seven, white or creamy white flowers and cup-shaped, cylindrical or barrel-shaped fruit.

== Description ==
Angophora melanoxylon is a tree that typically grows to a height of 15 m (49 ft) and forms a lignotuber. It has rough, fibrous, greyish bark on the trunk and branches. Young plants and coppice regrowth have sessile, lance-shaped, stem-clasping leaves that are 45–100 mm (1.8–3.9 in) long and 12–25 mm (0.5–1.0 in) wide and arranged in opposite pairs. Adult leaves are also arranged in opposite pairs, dull grey-green to green but paler on the lower surface, linear to narrow lance-shaped or narrow elliptical, 30–90 mm (1.2–3.5 in) long and 6–22 mm (0.2–0.9 in) wide either with a stem-clasping base or on a petiole up to 10 mm (0.4 in) long. The flower buds are arranged on the ends of branchlets on a branched peduncle 6–23 mm (0.2–0.9 in) long, each branch of the peduncle with three or seven buds on pedicels 3–9 mm (0.12–0.35 in) long. Mature buds are globe-shaped, 4–6 mm (0.16–0.24 in) long and 4–7 mm (0.16–0.28 in) wide with longitudinal ribs on the floral cup. The petals are white or creamy white with a green keel, 3–4 mm (0.12–0.16 in) long and wide. Flowering has been observed in December and the fruit is a woody cup-shaped, cylindrical or barrel-shaped capsule 8–13 mm (0.3–0.5 in) long and 7–11 mm (0.3–0.4 in) wide with the valves enclosed in the fruit.

== Taxonomy and naming ==
Angophora melanoxylon was first formally described in 1900 by Richard Thomas Baker in the Proceedings of the Linnean Society of New South Wales.

== Distribution and habitat ==
Coolabah apple grows in deep, sandy soils and occurs sporadically in dry areas between Pilliga, Coolabah and Bourke in New South Wales and Cunnamulla, Augathella and St George in Queensland.

== Conservation status ==
This eucalypt is classified as of "least concern" in Queensland under the Queensland Government Nature Conservation Act 1992. The IUCN Red List assesses the species as Least concern.
