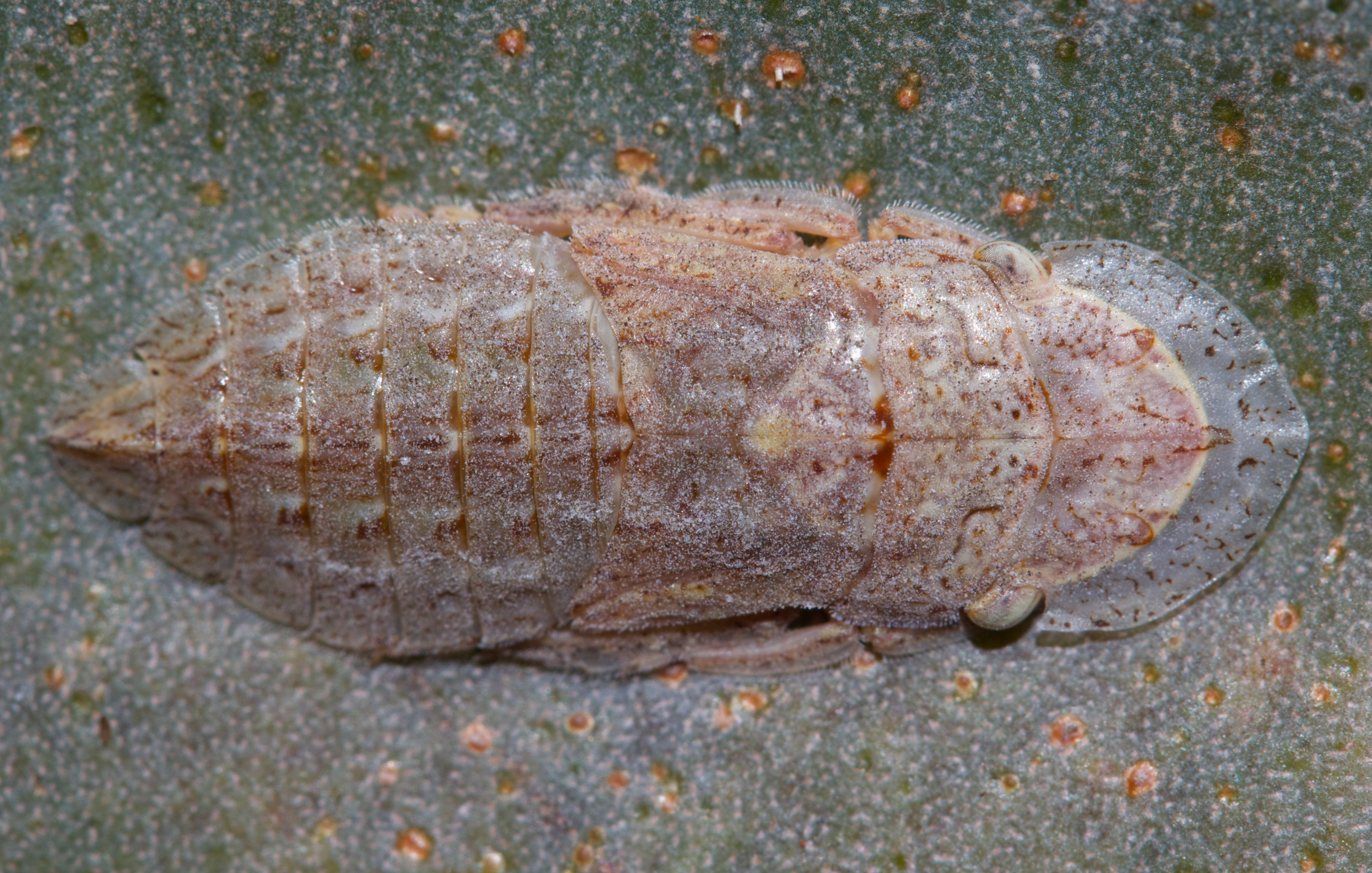

Scientific classification
- Kingdom: Animalia
- Phylum: Arthropoda
- Class: Insecta
- Order: Hemiptera
- Suborder: Auchenorrhyncha
- Family: Cicadellidae
- Genus: Stenocotis
- Species: S. depressa

Binomial name
- Stenocotis depressa (Walker, 1851)

= Stenocotis depressa =

Species of insect

Stenocotis depressa is a species of leafhoppers in the family Cicadellidae.
