= David Burton (botanist) =

David Burton (died 1792) was a botanist and surveyor in early colonial New South Wales.

He arrived in the colony in 1791 as superintendent of convicts, and with a private commission to collect plant and seed specimens for Sir Joseph Banks. He was immediately set to work surveying around Parramatta.

Late in 1791, Arthur Phillip asked Burton to write a report on the quality of the soil in the Parramatta region. During the course of his work, Burton made what is now recognised as one of the earliest recorded observations on soil allelopathy:

"where different species of red gum-trees grow, the earth has a great portion of oils mixed with it, and unless the ground is properly works and turned over to meliorate and dissolve these oils, the first crop will come to little account."

Burton collected a great many specimens for Banks over the following year, but in 1792 he accidentally shot himself while exploring the Nepean River.

The plant genus Burtonia is named in his honour.
