= James Britten =

English botanist (1846–1924)

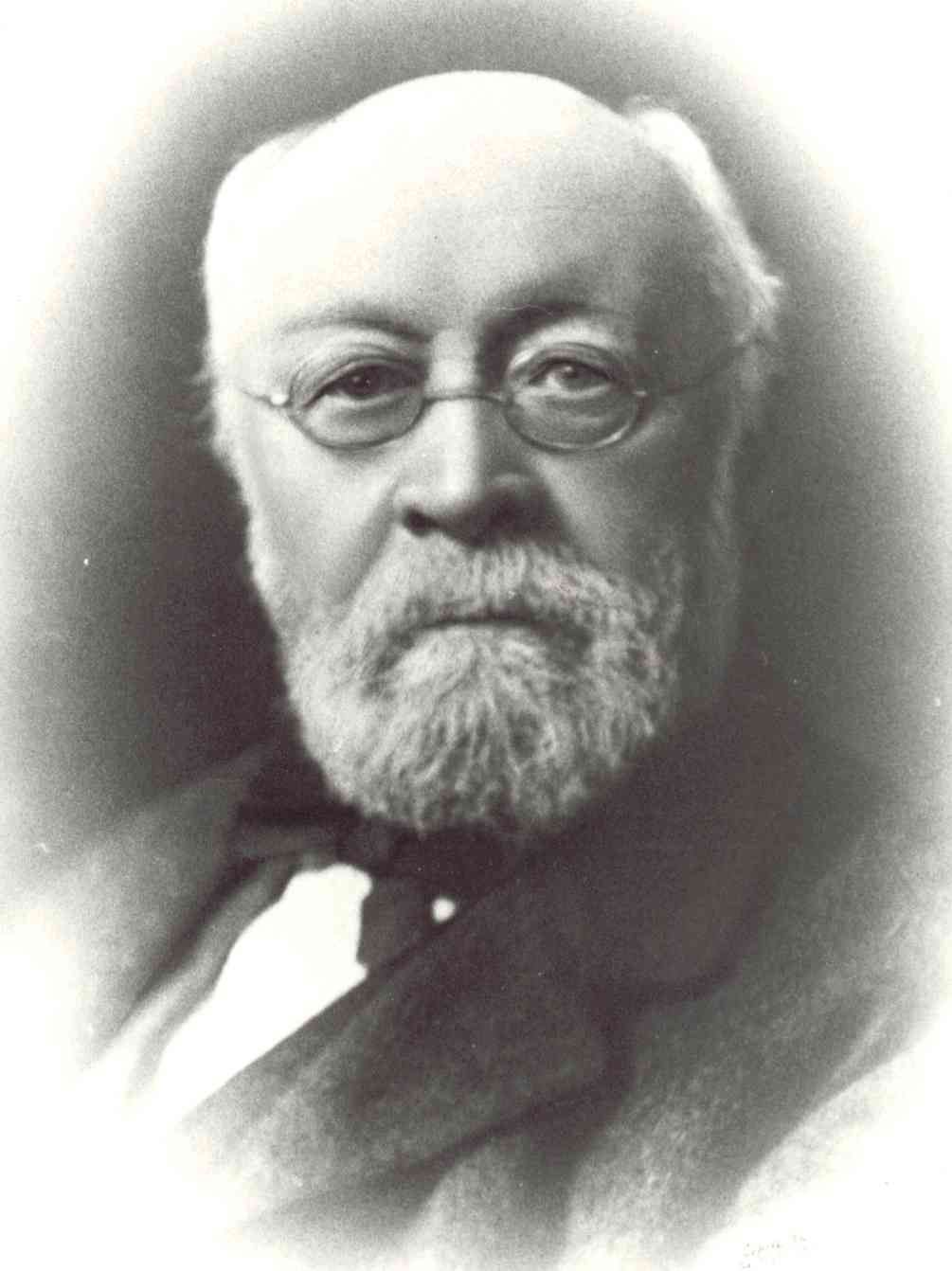
- Born: May 3, 1846; Chelsea, London, England
- Died: October 8, 1924 (aged 78)
- Known for: Editor of Journal of Botany, British and Foreign
- Scientific career
- Fields: Botany
- Workplaces: Royal Botanic Gardens, Kew; British Museum
- Author abbrev. (botany): Britten

James Britten (3 May 1846 – 8 October 1924) was an English botanist.

== Biography ==
Born in Chelsea, London, he moved to High Wycombe in 1865 to begin a medical career. However he became increasingly interested in botany, and began writing papers on the subject. His first publication was probably that published in the Journal of Botany in 1863. He became a Catholic in 1867, and was involved at various times in social work and training choirs in Brentford, Isleworth, and Southwark.

In 1869, he was appointed a junior at the Herbarium at the Royal Botanic Gardens, Kew. In 1871, he joined the Department of Botany at the British Museum and remained in this position until his retirement in 1909. In 1879, he succeeded Henry Trimen as editor of the Journal of Botany, British and Foreign. He would hold the editorship for around 45 years. Botanist Norman Hall wrote of Britten: "Britten threw himself fully into the editorship, although his pungent remarks on papers submitted were not always appreciated."

Britten was also heavily involved in the Catholic Truth Society. This had lapsed in 1872, but Britten helped revive it in 1884, and dominated the movement for many years. In 1896, during his time as secretary of the Society, they published Protestant Fiction.

This earned him an appointment as Knight and later Knight Commander of the Order of St. Gregory the Great by Pope Leo XIII. He died at age 79.

== Publications ==
- John Fleming MD, (1747-1829) botanist
