= Gregory John Leach =

Australian botanist (born 1952)

Gregory John Leach (born 1952) is an Australian botanist. His botanical author abbreviation is G.J.Leach.

He has worked particularly on Myrtaceae and Fabaceae and collected extensively in the Northern Territory and Papua New Guinea.

From 1990 to 1991, Leach served as Australian Botanical Liaison Officer at the Royal Botanic Gardens in Kew, London. He currently works for the Menzies School of Health in Darwin in the Child and Maternal Health Division, working, in particular, on traditional medicinal plants.

He earned his B.SC. Hon (1974) and Ph.D (1982) from La Trobe University.

== Publications (selection) ==
- A Systematic and Evolutionary Study of the Genus Angophora (Myrtaceae) . Publisher: School of Biological Sciences. LaTrobe University 1980. 622 pp.
- Freshwater Plants of Papua New Guinea . With Patrick L. Osborne. Publisher: University of Papua New Guinea Press, 1985. 254 pp. ISBN 9980-84-003-X
- Northern Territory Plant Species of Conservation Significance , Northern Territory botanical bull. 13. Publisher: Conservation Commission of the Northern Territory, 1992. 65 pp. ISBN 0-7245-2704-4
- Proposed Rustler's Roost Gold Mine: Fauna, Flora and Soils Study . 1993.
- Atlas of Vascular Rainforest Plants in the Top End of the Northern Territory, Australia . Along with DT Little, Jeremy Russell-Smith, John Brock and GT Connors. Publisher: Conservation Commission of the Northern Territory, 1994. 180 pp.
- Flora of the Darwin Region . Volume 2. With Clyde Robert Dunlop. Publisher: Conservation Commission of the Northern Territory, 1995. 261 pp.
- Handbook of the Vascular Plants of Ashmore and Cartier Islands . With Gilbert D. Pike and James J. Leach. Publisher: Parks Australia, 1997. 156 pp. ISBN 0-7245-2759-1
