= A. exul =

A. exul may refer to:

- Abacetus exul, a ground beetle
- Angophora exul, the Gibraltar rock apple, a tree native to eastern Australia
