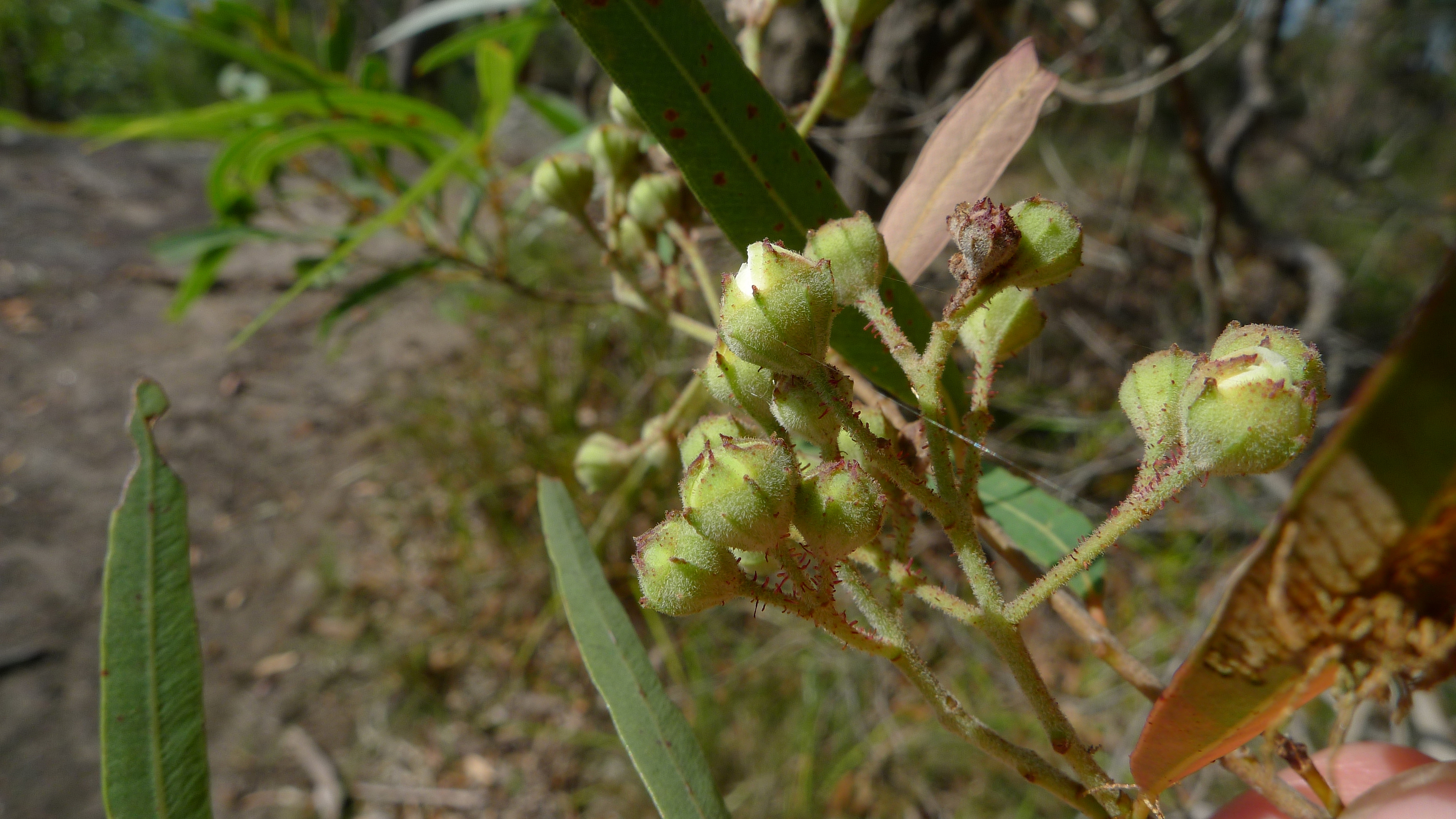
- Flower buds of Angophora bakeri in Jannali

Scientific classification
- Kingdom: Plantae
- Clade: Tracheophytes
- Clade: Angiosperms
- Clade: Eudicots
- Clade: Rosids
- Order: Myrtales
- Family: Myrtaceae
- Genus: Angophora
- Species: A. bakeri
- Subspecies: A. b. subsp. bakeri

Trinomial name
- Angophora bakeri subsp. bakeri E.C.Hall

Synonyms
- Angophora bakeri subsp. paludosa G.J.Leach; Angophora exul K.D.Hill; Angophora lanceolata var. angustifolia A.Gray; Angophora paludosa (G.J.Leach) K.R.Thiele & Ladiges; Eucalyptus angustata Brooker; Eucalyptus exul (K.D.Hill) Brooker; Eucalyptus palustris Brooker

= Angophora bakeri subsp. bakeri =

Narrow-leaved apple

Subspecies of tree

Angophora bakeri subsp. bakeri, commonly known as narrow-leaved apple, is a small to medium-sized tree that is endemic to New South Wales. It has rough bark on the trunk and branches, flower buds in groups of three or seven, white or creamy white flowers and cup-shaped to barrel-shaped fruit.

== Description ==
Angophora bakeri subsp. bakeri is a tree that typically grows to a height of 6–20 m (20–66 ft) and forms a lignotuber. It has rough, grey, softly fibrous bark on the trunk and branches. Young plants and coppice regrowth have narrow lance-shaped to linear leaves that are 50–100 mm (2.0–3.9 in) long, 4–10 mm (0.16–0.39 in) wideand arranged in opposite pairs. Adult leaves are arranged in opposite pairs, thin and flexible, glossy green, a dull pale green on the lower surface, narrow lance-shaped to linear or curved, 50–130 mm (2.0–5.1 in) long and 5–15 mm (0.20–0.59 in) wide, tapering to a petiole 3–7 mm (0.12–0.28 in) long. The flower buds are arranged on the ends of branchlets in groups of three or seven on peduncles 7–18 mm (0.28–0.71 in) long, the individual buds on pedicels 4–11 mm (0.16–0.43 in) long. Mature buds are globe-shaped, 4–5 mm (0.16–0.20 in) long and wide with longitudinal ribs. The petals are white with a green keel and about 3 mm (0.12 in) long and wide. Flowering occurs from December to February. The fruit is a cup-shaped to barrel-shaped capsule 7–10 mm (0.28–0.39 in) long and 7–12 mm (0.28–0.47 in) wide with longitudinal ribs and with the valves enclosed in the fruit.

== Taxonomy and naming ==
Angophora bakeri was first formally described in 1913 by Edwin Cuthbert Hall and in 1986 Gregory John Leach described two subspecies in the journal Telopea, including the autonym, subspecies bakeri.

== Distribution and habitat ==
This subspecies grows in sandy soil on sandstone is most common on the Central Coast of New South Wales, but there are disjunct populations north of Newcastle and as far south as Yalwal. There is also population, previously known as A. exul, in the Gibraltar Range National Park.
