= Burra Bee Dee Mission =

- Location within New South Wales Location within Australia
- 31°14′07″S 149°20′41″E
- Location: Oxley Highway, Coonabarabran, Warrumbungle Shire, New South Wales, Australia

History
- Built: 1892–1957

Site notes
- Owner: Coonabarabran Local Aboriginal Land Council; Department of Trade & Investment, Regional Infrastructure & Services

New South Wales Heritage Register
- Official name: Burra Bee Dee Mission; Forked Mountain
- Type: State heritage (built)
- Designated: 4 June 2004
- Reference no.: 1688
- Type: Site complex
- Category: Aboriginal

Burra Bee Dee Mission is a heritage-listed former Indigenous Australian mission, still in use as a cemetery on the Oxley Highway at Coonabarabran in the Orana region of New South Wales, Australia. It was built from 1892 to 1957. It is also known as Forked Mountain. The property is owned by Coonabarabran Local Aboriginal Land Council and the Department of Trade & Investment, Regional Infrastructure & Services (State Government). It was added to the New South Wales State Heritage Register on 4 June 2004.

== History ==
Burra Bee Dee Mission was founded in 1908. In 1892 Mary Jane Cain who originally lived on the river bank close to town who used to run goats of which would get away from her and head to Forky Mountain. It was this that eventually made Cain and husband to build a place out at Forked Mountain for her to stay. Cain wrote to Queen Victoria on numerous occasions requesting that the land was to be granted to her. Queen Victoria granted that Burra Bee Dee or part thereof be handed to Cain and Queen Victoria requested that Mary Jane was to manage the property and was required to provide a place for the dark people (sic) to live on. The land there was later reserved for Aboriginal use and in the early 1900 was brought under the control of the Aboriginal Protection Board and became a managed station. Burra Bee Dee Aboriginal Reserve was gazetted on the 21 February, and it was made of three reserves in existence: in 1892, one of 160 hectares (400 acres); in 1906, one of 30 hectares (73 acres); and in 1911, one of 40 hectares (100 acres). Other major camps in the Coonabarabran area that were not under the Board control included the showgrounds and Gunnedah Hill.

Burra Bee Dee was originally known as Forky Mountain after the hill that dominates the landscape. The mountain was the reason for Cain's visit to the place to shepherd her goats back to Coonabarabran. The land which was originally granted to Cain was officially known as Forky Mountain until the name was changed to Burra Bee Dee somewhere around 1911. The significance of the name Burra Bee Dee is an Aboriginal word meaning flying mice. Just as the Mountain is a significant and organising feature of the landscape it is often a significant and organising feature of the language, the stories of Burra Bee Dee. Forky Mountain was significant to the people of Burra Bee Dee as it was a birthplace, a place for burials and a food source.

The first hut on the mission was built by Cain and her husband which was a boarded house with tin and bark and a dirt floor. With the influx of Cain's extended family and other families from around the district peoples dwellings ranged from bag houses made of Hessian bags, tents, and bark and kerosene – tin shacks. To the two roomed fibro houses built during the peak of the managers days. The shacks were built in clusters and added to when needed. The clusters were known by the women who ran them Granny Cain, Queenie's place and Granny Fuller's. The only houses built in rows facing the road were the five or six fibro houses that the government built in later times.

Not only was the Burra Bee Dee mission used by Aboriginal people as a place for dwelling other areas such as Gunnedah Hill and Coonabarabran Showground were also other places of dwelling. Although neither groups in the beginning liked each other they all eventually ended up living at Burra Bee Dee.

In 1924 two women came to Burra Bee Dee as Missionaries. They lived and worked with the people for 30 years and were very much an institution in Burra Bee Dee life. Mr Marney one of the Burra Bee Dee residents built the church for the missionaries to live in on the mission. The women held sewing classes which every year they held a show. Church was held every Sunday morning with Sunday school in the morning for the children and church of an afternoon.

== Description ==
The site covers approximately 628 hectares (1,550 acres) of land which includes the mountain known as Forky Mountain. Throughout the area there is no physical buildings, remains or objects of former dwellings such as housing, school or the church.

The only remaining site at Burra Bee Dee Mission is the cemetery which is still currently being used by the local community.

In the early 1970s the original school house was removed and is being used for private use.

As at 16 January 2004, certain specific areas within the boundary were reported to have high potential for archaeological evidence. These included the main area of the mission and surroundings and at the base of Forky Mountain.

The community would like to preserve the area and enable educational visits and tours to the area to promote Aboriginal heritage. Enhancements such as an interpretation trail around the main area of the mission and possibly a cultural centre to house the memorabilia and artefacts and educational information about life on the mission.

== Heritage listing ==
Burra Bee Dee Mission and Forky Mountain is of State significance as it maintains and continues to show the historical process and activities and is a place of occupancy of Aboriginal people from the district. The site is associated to a significant historical phase of NSW as it was land granted to an Aboriginal woman, Cain in the early 1900s by Queen Victoria and gazetted in 1911 as an Aboriginal Reserve. The area is able to demonstrate the strong associations to past customs and provides an understanding of cultural practices that were undertaken. The site of Burra Bee Dee mission, the cemetery and Forky Mountain is associated to the Gamilaraay people as a significant place as it is the original site of occupation for many Aboriginal people, it is associated to the memory of Mary Jane Cain and it is a place of cultural, spiritual, historical and social values.

Burra Bee Dee Mission was listed on the New South Wales State Heritage Register on 4 June 2004 having satisfied the following criteria.

"The place is important in demonstrating the course, or pattern, of cultural or natural history in New South Wales."

Burra Bee Dee Mission and Forky Mountain shows evidence of the activity that was undertaken by the local Aboriginal people. Founded by Mary Jane Cain in 1892, and formerly known as Forky Mountain, Burra Bee Dee Mission became a home to many Aboriginal people across the district. Originally granted to Cain in the early 1900s by Queen Victoria, the area was gazetted in 1911 as an Aboriginal Reserve and the named changed to Burra Bee Dee Mission. The area is of State significance as it is able to demonstrate strong associations to past customs and provides an understanding of a historical phase of the Gamilaraay people and cultural practices that were undertaken. The Gamilaraay people continue to visit the site to undertake cultural practices and maintain the original cemetery which is still used today. The relationship to that of Forky Mountain also has not only a spiritual connection to the Gamiliaraay people but a connection to land as Forky Mountain played a significant role in the occupation sites within the Mission.

"The place has a strong or special association with a person, or group of persons, of importance of cultural or natural history of New South Wales's history."

Burra Bee Dee came about the efforts of one Aboriginal woman, Cain. Due to a flock of wandering goats, Cain and her family made Forky Mountain their home in the late 1800s. Through the efforts and persistence of Cain, Burra Bee Dee was formalised in 1911 and became a place of occupation and food for the local Aboriginal people and Aboriginal people from around the district. Burra Bee Dee became an important centre for the local Gamilaraay people and a significant place of occupation. The site of Burra Bee Dee mission, the cemetery and Forky Mountain is associated to the Gamilaraay people as a significant place as it is the original site of occupation for many Aboriginal people, it is associated to the memory of Cain and it is a place of cultural, spiritual, historical and social values.

"The place has a strong or special association with a particular community or cultural group in New South Wales for social, cultural or spiritual reasons."

Burra Bee Dee and Forky Mountain has a strong and special association for the Gamilaraay people for its social, cultural and spiritual values. The area is well known for its linkages with dreaming stories and Forky Mountain is often a significant and organising feature of the language and the stories. Forky Mountain was a special place for being "born under the mountain" and being buried at the 'foot of the mountain and it was a special place of the "Sun Dance", a ritual that occurred every Easter Sunday, where many would climb to the tip of the mountain to watch the sun dance. Burra Bee Dee and Forky Mountain is a place of importance and belonging to the Gamilaraay people.

"The place has potential to yield information that will contribute to an understanding of the cultural or natural history of New South Wales."

The base of Forky Mountain has the potential to yield new archaeological information and provide evidence of past human cultural activities. Further documentation of oral histories of elders and collection of memorbila and interpretation of the area will further enhance the documentation that is already provided.

"The place is important in demonstrating the principal characteristics of a class of cultural or natural places/environments in New South Wales."

Burra Bee Dee and Forky Mountain is highly significant to the Gamilaraay people to their cultural heritage values. The area is outstanding as it is able to demonstrate the principal characteristics of the Gamilaraay people. Being the site of the original settlement at the base of Forky Mountain and then later the gazette "Mission" site, the area has the attributes to demonstrate the way of life and customs of the Gamilaraay people. Although there are no physical buildings remaining, the original cemetery is all that remains and is maintain and used by the local Aboriginal community.

== See also ==
- List of Aboriginal missions in New South Wales
