= Davey Street Congregational Church =

Church in Hobart, Tasmania, Australia

Davey Street Congregational Church (former)
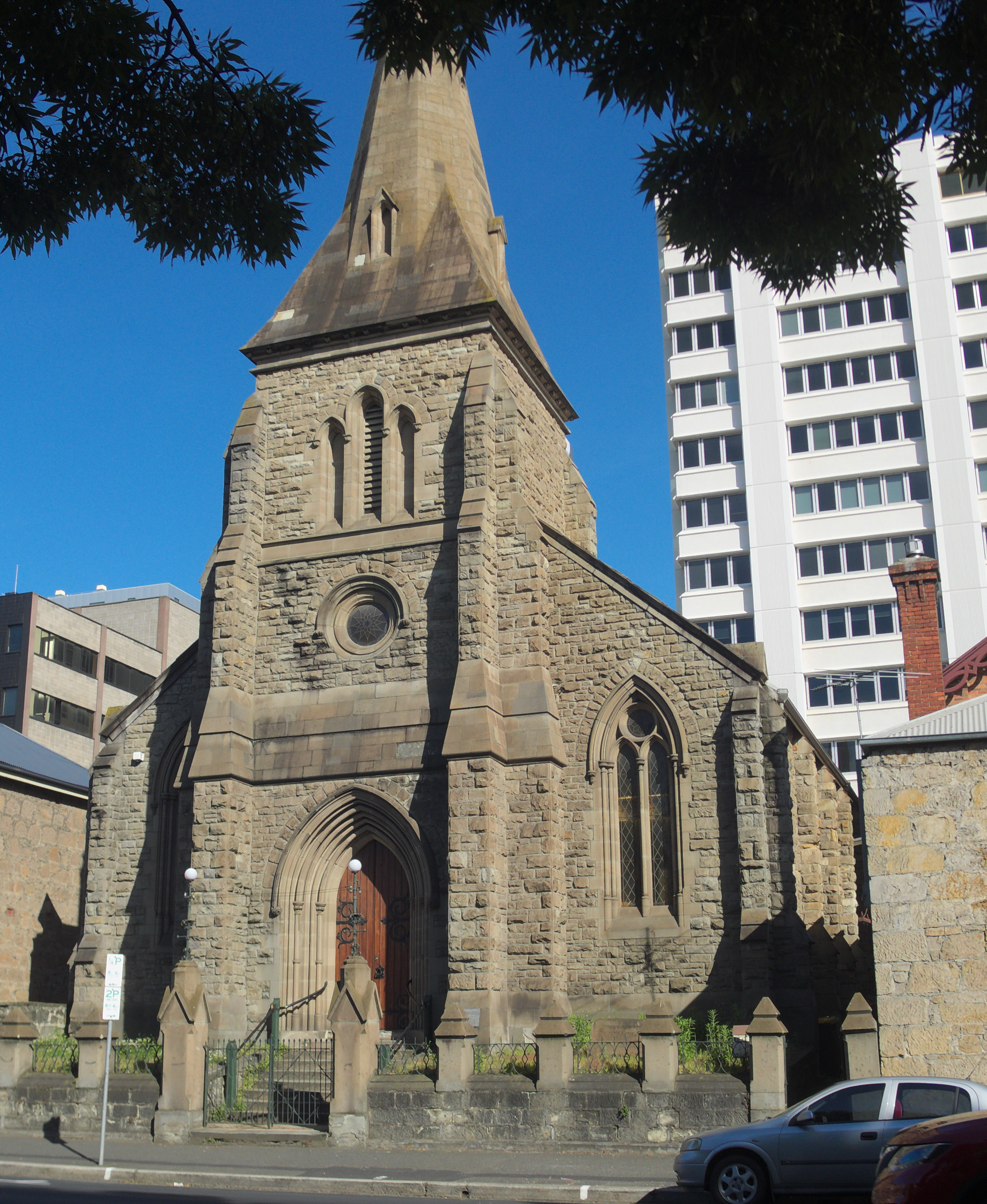
- Davey Street Congregational Church in November 2017
- Davey Street Congregational Church (former)
- 42°53′08″S 147°19′40″E
- Address: 47 Davey Street, Hobart, Tasmania
- Country: Australia
- Denomination: Congregational (1857 – 1973)

History
- Status: Church (1857 – 1973)
- Founded: 31 July 1856
- Founder(s): Henry Hopkins, Esq.
- Dedicated: 16 August 1857

Architecture
- Functional status: Abandoned (sold)
- Architects: Charles Tiffin; William Davidson
- Architectural type: Church
- Style: Gothic Revival
- Construction cost: A£7,000
- Closed: March 1973

Specifications
- Capacity: 700 people
- Materials: Risdon freestone; slate

The Davey Street Congregational Church is a former Congregational church located at 47 Davey Street, Hobart, Tasmania, Australia. Established in 1857 and closed in 1973, it played a significant role in Hobart's religious and community life.

== Location ==
Located at 47 Davey Street, the church is situated within the Hobart central business district, neighbouring the Hobart Real Tennis Club and directly opposite St David's Park. Its tall spire makes it a prominent Davey Street landmark.

== History ==
=== Early years ===
The foundation stone was laid by Henry Hopkins on 31 July 1856. Designed by Charles Tiffin and William Montgomery Davenport Davidson, the church was officially opened on 16 August 1857.

Hopkins, a well-known philanthropist, funded much of the church's construction. The first minister, George Clarke, served the congregation for 52 years, from its opening until 1909.

=== Growth and changes ===
While Clarke travelled in England and Palestine, Stafford Bird, a politician who later became Premier of Tasmania, served as minister from 1874 to 1877. In later years, Frederick Pratt was another prominent minister, serving from 1925 to 1928.

The church remained a key religious site until its closure in March 1973, when the congregation merged with the Memorial Congregational Church.

=== Transition to community use ===
After its closure, the building became the headquarters for Colony 47, a community organisation that operated from the church for over 30 years. Colony 47 vacated the building in 2012, and the church was later sold.

=== Sale and repurposing ===
In March 2022, the former church was listed for sale again, offering only the second opportunity in its 165-year history to purchase the building.

== Architecture ==
The church is designed in the Victorian Gothic Revival style by Charles Tiffin and William Montgomery Davenport Davidson. It features Risdon freestone with a slate roof. Its most notable feature is the 29-metre (94 ft) spire, which makes it a recognisable landmark to the Davey St streetscape.

Inside, the church originally accommodated up to 700 people. The design reflects a simple yet elegant aesthetic, typical of mid-19th-century ecclesiastical architecture in Tasmania.

== Notable ministers ==
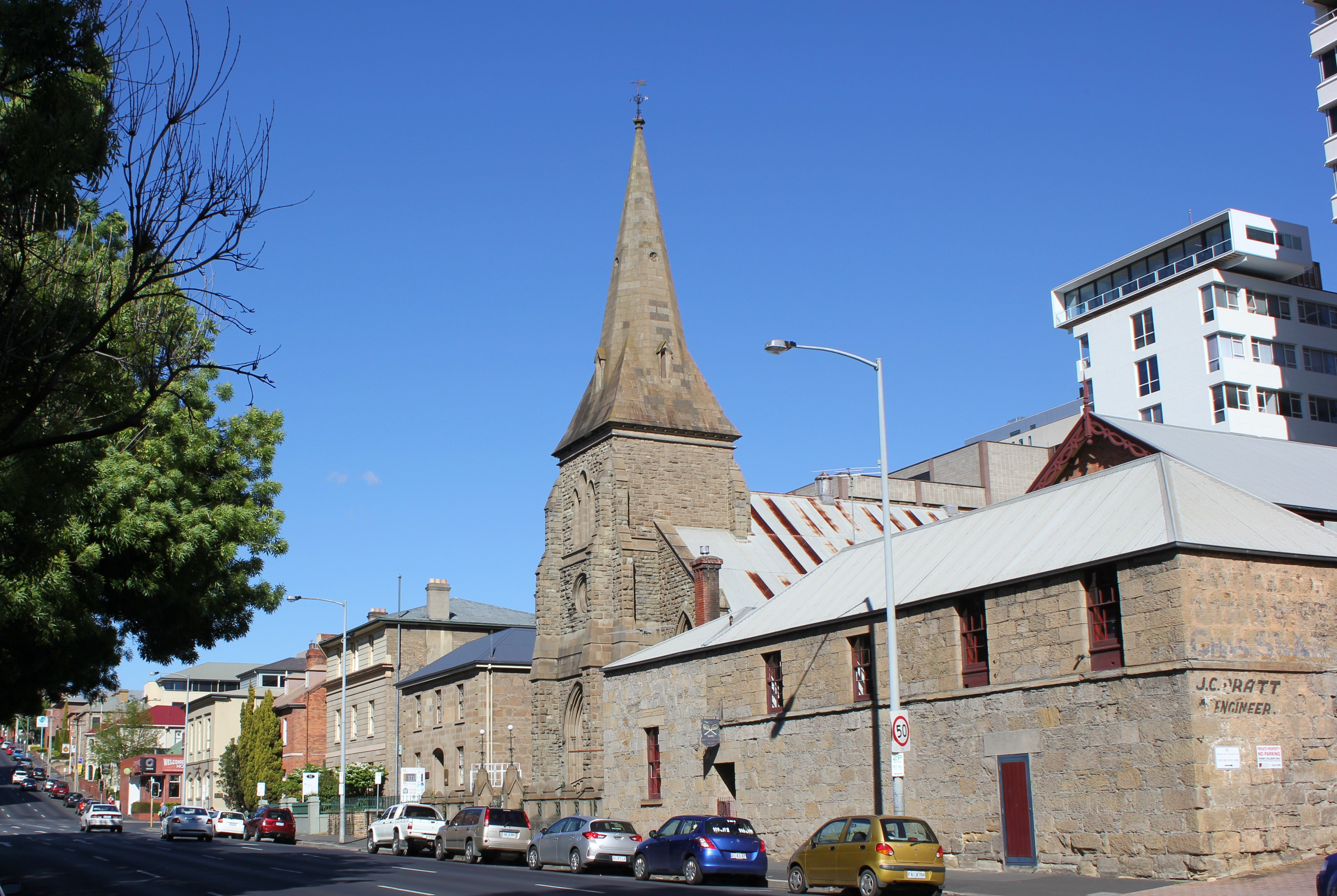
Davey Street streetscape

Minister	Tenure	Notes
George Clarke	1857–1909	The church's first and longest-serving minister.
Stafford Bird	1874–1877	Temporary minister and prominent Tasmanian politician who later became Treasurer of Tasmania.
Frederick Pratt	1925–1928	A significant minister during the 20th century.

== Community legacy ==
The building played a significant role in the foundation of Colony 47, a Hobart-based organisation supporting disadvantaged individuals. Its long history as a community resource is a lasting legacy of its original Congregational mission.
