= Angophora paludosa =

Scientific classification
- Kingdom: Plantae
- Clade: Tracheophytes
- Clade: Angiosperms
- Clade: Eudicots
- Clade: Rosids
- Order: Myrtales
- Family: Myrtaceae
- Genus: Angophora
- Species: A. paludosa

Binomial name
- Angophora paludosa (G.J.Leach) K.R.Thiele & Ladiges

Species of tree

Angophora paludosa is a tree species that is native to eastern Australia.

The tree typically grows to a height of 15 metres (49 ft) with grey shortly fibrous bark that is persistent throughout.

Angophora paludosa is now regarded as a synonym of A. bakeri subsp. bakeri by the Australian Plant Census.
