= John Halliday (ophthalmologist) =

Australian ophthalmologist (1871 – 1946)

Dr John Halliday MB ChM (Syd) DPH (Camb) FRCS (Edin) FRACS
- Born: 19 June 1871; Bathurst, New South Wales
- Died: 23 September 1946 (aged 75); Sydney
- Education: Newington College; University of Sydney
- Occupation: Ophthalmologist

John Charles White Halliday (19 June 1871 – 23 September 1946) was an Australian ophthalmologist who popularised intracapsular cataract extraction in Sydney.

== Early life ==
John Halliday was the youngest of eight children of Francis and Mary Halliday. His father was a Justice of the Peace and served as Mayor of Bathurst. He attended All Saints' College, Bathurst, in his early school years. In 1888, he was enrolled as Charles Halliday as a boarder at Newington College. In his first year, he was awarded the Form V Classics Prize, the School Prize, and the Mathematics Prize. Halliday was a member and Secretary of the College Literary and Debating Society, he served in the Cadet Corps and was a Prefect. In 1889 he won the Wigram Allen Scholarship, awarded by Sir George Wigram Allen, for General Proficiency, with Edwin Cuthbert Hall receiving it in the same year for Mathematics. At the end of the year, Halliday was named Dux of the College and received the Schofield Scholarship. He went up to the University of Sydney, reverting to the name of John Halliday, and in 1896 graduated as a Bachelor of Medicine and Chirurgery.

== Medical career ==
In 1898 and 1899, Halliday studied ophthalmology in England before returning to Sydney and establishing a general practice at Rockdale, New South Wales. He commenced special practice in Macquarie Street, Sydney in 1901 and was appointed as Clinical Assistant in Ophthalmology at Royal Prince Alfred Hospital (RPA). Five years later he was promoted to Assistant Honorary Ophthalmic Surgeon and was appointed as Acting Assistant Ophthalmic Surgeon at Sydney Hospital. Halliday travelled to Amritsar, India, to study intracapsular cataract extraction under Lieut. Col. Henry Smith. For eleven years from 1920 Halliday was an Honorary Ophthalmic Surgeon at RPA and then a Consulting Ophthalmic Surgeon. He also practiced as Consulting Surgeon to the Royal Alexandra Hospital for Children, Prince Henry Hospital (the Coast Hospital), the Royal Institute for Deaf and Blind Children, and the Church of England Homes for Children. He was awarded a DPH from the University of Cambridge and was a Fellow of the Royal College of Surgeons of Edinburgh and a Fellow of the Royal Australasian College of Surgeons. Halliday was a member of the Ophthalmological Society of New South Wales and was pivotal in the establishment of the Optical Prescription Spectacle Makers in 1932 and the Medical Eye Service Clinic in 1934.

== Family life ==
In 1903 John Halliday married Fannie Hindmarsh and they had six children. Their youngest son, Francis Bathurst Halliday, studied medicine and became an ophthalmologist. On his death, Halliday was survived by his wife and children.

Awards
Preceded by Frederick Pratt	Schofield Scholarship; Dux of Newington College; 1889	Succeeded by David Edwards
