= David Edwards (judge) =

Australian judge

David Sutherland Edwards
- Born: 19 September 1871; Coonabarabran, New South Wales
- Died: 21 July 1936; Ashfield, New South Wales
- Education: Newington College; University of Sydney
- Occupations: Solicitor, Barrister, Electoral Commissioner, Royal Commissioner, Judge
- Title: His Honour Judge
- Spouse: Beatrice (née Elmer)
- Children: 3 sons and 1 daughter
- Parent(s): Frederick William Edwards and Elizabeth (née Watt)

David Sutherland Edwards (19 September 1871 – 21 July 1936) was an Australian judge of the District Court of New South Wales, a NSW Electoral Commissioner and Royal Commissioner.

== Early life ==
Edwards was born in Coonabarabran, New South Wales a son of Frederick William Edwards, Stipendiary Magistrate. From Coonabarabran Public School he won a scholarship to West Maitland High School. Three years later, when his father was promoted from police magistrate to stipendiary magistrate and was transferred to Sydney, he became a pupil at Newington College (1889–1891). At the University of Sydney he graduated B.A., with first-class honours in Latin and second-class honours in Greek, in 1895, and gained his LL.B. degree in 1899. From 1895 to 1897, whilst a student at the university, he was on the teaching staff of Newington College.

== Tennis career ==
Edwards was an excellent tennis player, and represented New South Wales against Victoria in 1896, 1898, 1899 (twice), 1900, and 1901 (twice). On one occasion, though not in an interstate match, he defeated Norman Brookes.

== Legal career ==
After graduating Edwards read for the Bar with C. B. Stephen and Sir William Owen. Upon his admission he practised at the Bar with until his elevation to the Bench of the District Court of New South Wales on 1 July 1924. He was appointed Electoral Commissioner for New South Wales on 19 February 1929, and retained that position, in addition to his Judgeship, until November 1934. He was chairman of the Commission which dealt with State electoral boundaries in 1931, and also sat on the Royal Commission on the Federal Land Tax. He resigned from the Bench in July 1935, because of failing health.

== Publications ==
He was the author of a Manual for Justices, and, in collaboration with Herbert Curlewis, he wrote a book on prohibitions, both at common law and under the Justices Act. In collaboration with E. A. A. Russell, he edited a standard work on the Commonwealth Bills of Exchange Act in 1912, and he also collaborated with W. Tighe and Percival Halse Rogers in producing a work on the Workers' Compensation Act in 1916.

== Family ==
In 1910, Edwards married Beatrice Elmer, who on his death survived him. They had three sons, Colin, Phillp David, and Maxwell Sutherland, and one daughter, Elmer Nancy. Edwards died at home in Ashfield, New South Wales and the funeral took place at Rookwood Cemetery after a service at St. Andrew's Anglican Church, Summer Hill.

Awards
Preceded by Charles Halliday	Schofield Scholarship; Dux of Newington College; 1890	Succeeded by Edwin Hall
