= Charles Tiffin =

English architect

Brisbane Courier, 27 December 1859

Charles Tiffin (1833–1873) was an English architect, who spent most of his career in Queensland, Australia where he held the post of Queensland Colonial Architect.

== Early life ==
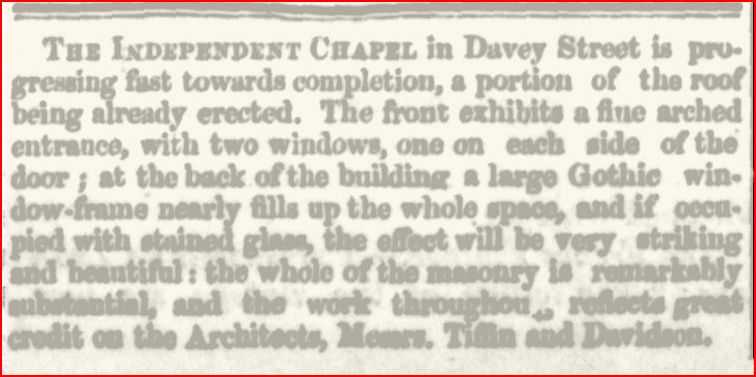
Hobart Mercury, 10 Jan 1857

He was born in Newcastle upon Tyne, England where he studied under local architects M. Thompson and John Edward Watson.

In 1855 he immigrated to Geelong, Victoria, Australia.

Shortly after, he became a partner in the architectural practice of Tiffin & Davidson in Hobart, Tasmania, together with William Montgomery Davenport Davidson (who was later the Queensland Surveyor-General). Their works included:

- Congregational Church, Davey Street, Hobart

On 1 January 1857, he married Mary Ann Haig, second daughter of Captain Andrew Haig, at St George's Church in Hobart.

== Queensland Architecture ==
In May 1857 Charles Tiffin became the Clerk of Works in the Moreton Bay District.

In December 1859, Tiffin became Colonial Architect for the colony of Queensland, Australia.

He designed and supervised the construction of over 300 Queensland buildings including:

- Ipswich Courthouse (1859)
- Wharf Street Congregational Church, Brisbane (1859–1860)
- Government House, Brisbane (1860–1862)
- Maryborough Bond Store (1863)
- Maryborough Post Office (1865–1866)
- General Hospital, Brisbane (1865)
- the Main Wing of Queensland Parliament House (facing George Street) (1865–1867).
- Immigration Depot, William Street Brisbane (1865)
- Church of England, Kedron Brook
- St Matthews Anglican Church, Grovely (1867–1869)
- the Walter Hill fountain in the City Botanic Gardens (1867)
Buildings designed by Charles Tiffin
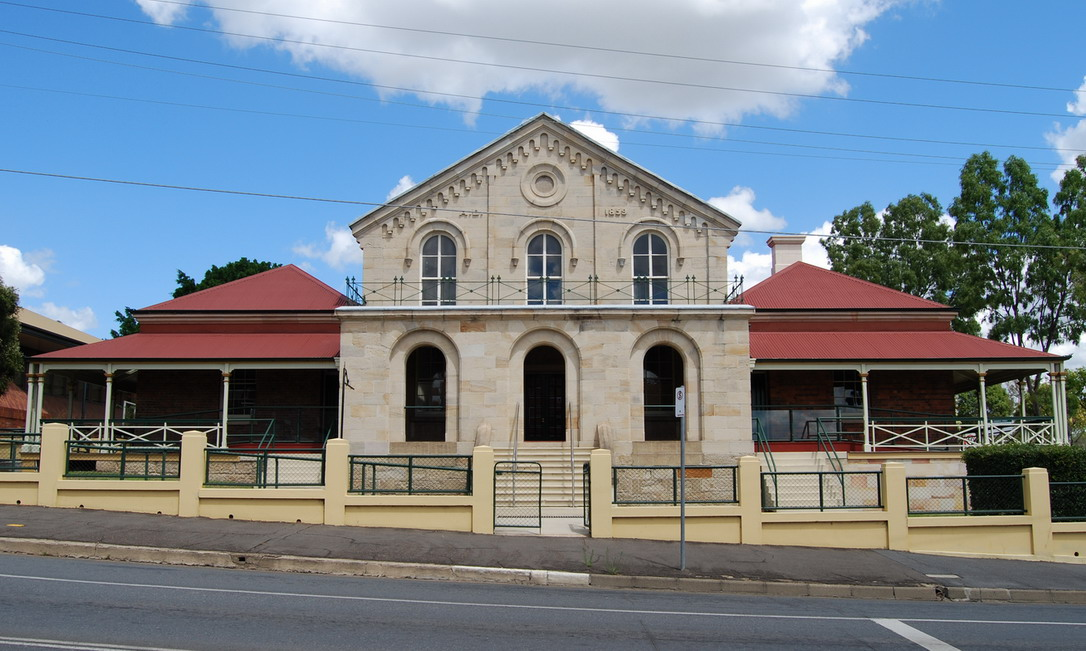
Ipswich Courthouse, 2009

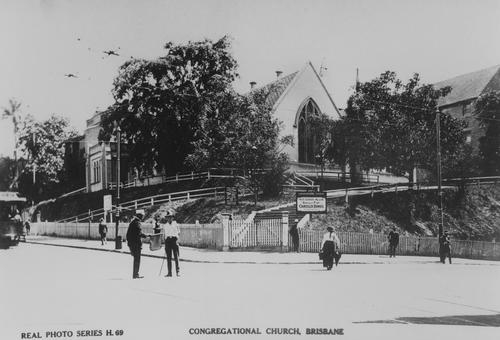
Wharf St Congregational Church, Brisbane

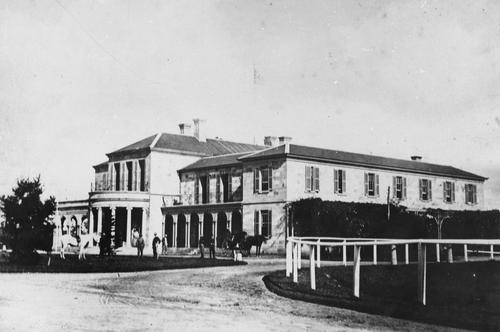
Government House, Brisbane

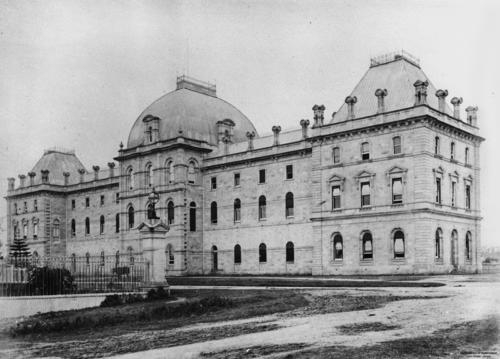
Queensland Parliament House

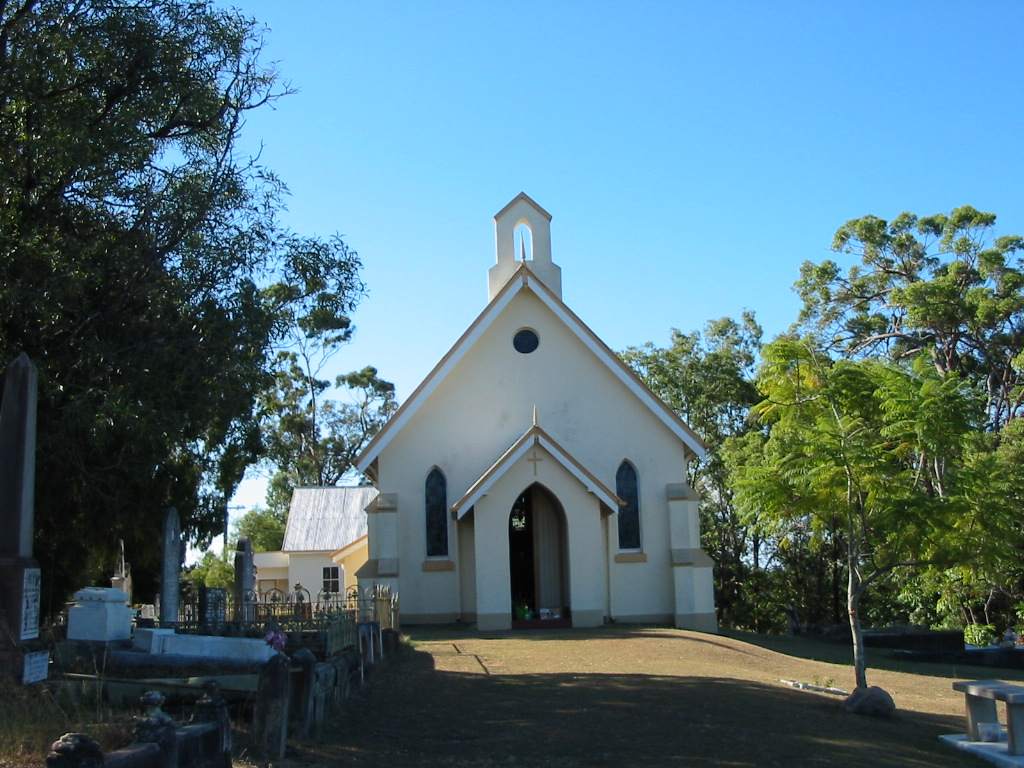
St Matthew's Church, Grovely

== Miscellaneous ==
He participated in the Brisbane School of Arts and the Queensland Philosophical Society.

In 1866, Charles Tiffin developed an earth closet, an early form of toilet used for many years in Queensland. He took out a patent in 1869.

== End of career and death ==
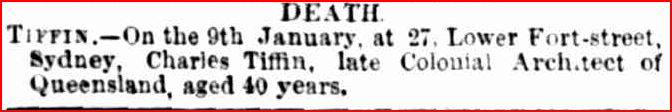
Brisbane Courier, 20 Feb 1873, page 2

From 1868 to 1871 Charles Tiffin was also the Superintendent of Roads and Bridges. However, in 1871, he criticised the government's policy on roads. His career ended at that time. He took a year of leave and then retired on medical grounds in April 1872. He died on 9 January 1873 at 27 Lower Fort Street, Sydney, New South Wales at the age of 40.

His wife Mary Ann returned to Brisbane until her death in 1923 at the Diamantina Hospital in Brisbane, Queensland.

== See also ==
- Category:Charles Tiffin buildings
