= Coonabarabran Times =

Newspaper in New South Wales, Australia

The Coonabarabran Times is a weekly newspaper published each Thursday in Coonabarabran, New South Wales, Australia.

== History ==
In 1927 Coonabarabran Clarion, Bligh Watchman (Coonabarabran) and Baradine Advocate combined to form Coonabarabran Times. The Bligh Watchman had been in publication since 1879 and was also known as the Bligh Watchman and Coonabarabran Gazette. The Coonabarabran Clarion had been in publication since 1911. The paper's circulation declined from 2,898 in 1970 to 2,800 in 1980 and further to 2,503 in 1990. Its current circulation is 2,700.

== Digitisation ==
This newspaper has not yet been digitised.

== See also ==
- List of newspapers in Australia
- List of newspapers in New South Wales
