= Elizabeth Bryan (executive) =

Australian executive director

Elizabeth Blomfield Bryan AM is an Australian executive director. She was the first woman to run a large financial institution in Australia.

== Biography ==
Bryan grew up on her family's cattle and sheep properties near Coonabarabran in northern New South Wales. She graduated with a bachelor of arts degree in economics from the Australian National University in 1968. She also completed a graduate degree at the University of Hawaiʻi at Hilo.

In 1992, Bryan was appointed head of the New South Wales State Super and Investment Management Corporation, becoming the first woman to run a financial institution of its size. In 1996, she became managing director of Axiom Funds Management until the company was sold to Deutsche Bank and she became chief executive officer of Deutsche Asset Management.

Bryan has held chair of the board positions and directorships for Virgin Australia, Caltex Australia and Westpac. She is also chair of Insurance Australia Group.

=== Recognition ===
In 2013, Bryan was appointed a Member of the Order of Australia.
