= Angophora exul =

Scientific classification
- Kingdom: Plantae
- Clade: Tracheophytes
- Clade: Angiosperms
- Clade: Eudicots
- Clade: Rosids
- Order: Myrtales
- Family: Myrtaceae
- Genus: Angophora
- Species: A. exul

Binomial name
- Angophora exul K.D.Hill

Species of tree

Angophora exul, commonly known as the Gibraltar rock apple, is an endangered tree native to a small area in eastern Australia.

The tree typically grows to a height of 8 metres (26 ft) and has shortly fibrous bark that is persistent throughout.

Angophora exul is now accepted as a synonym of A. bakeri subsp. exul by the Australian Plant Census.
