= Coonabarabran High School =

Public high school in New South Wales, Australia

Location
- Newell Highway, Coonabarabran, New South Wales; Australia
- Coordinates: 31.2828°S 149.2839°E

Information
- Type: Public co-educational secondary day school
- Motto: Forever Dare
- Established: 1 January 1942 (Intermediate High School); 1 January 1962 (High School)
- Educational authority: NSW Department of Education
- Principal: Mary Doolan
- Years: 7–12
- Enrolment: ~318 (2022)
- Colour(s): Navy and gold
- Yearbook: The Warrum bungle
- Website: coonabarab-h.schools.nsw.gov.au

Coonabarabran High School (abbreviated as CHS) is a public co-educational secondary day school, located on the Newell Highway in southern Coonabarabran, a town located in the Central West and North West Slopes regions of New South Wales, Australia. The school is operated by the NSW Department of Education with students from Year 7 to Year 12. The school was originally established in January 1942 as the Coonabarabran Intermediate High School, providing primary and secondary education, and later reconstituted in 1962 as a comprehensive high school.

== History ==
Following an appeal by the Parents & Citizens' Association of Coonabarabran Public School to the Minister for Education, Clive Evatt, in late 1941, the NSW Department of Education made the decision to upgrade the existing Coonabarabran Public School (established in 1870) to the status of "Intermediate High School", with the existing school now providing primary and secondary education. The headmaster of the public school, A. C. Innes, BA, continued as the first headmaster of Coonabarabran Intermediate High School. On 18 March 1942, Minister Evatt formally opened the school, laying a memorial stone to mark the occasion.

In January 1962, a separate "Coonabarabran High School" was established, again separating primary and secondary education between Coonabarabran Public School and the new Coonabarabran High School, respectively. In 1972–1973, a new purpose-built school campus to the south of the public school site was completed. On 16 October 1974, the school was visited by Charles, The Prince of Wales. In the 2006 Queen's Birthday Honours, the school principal from 1999 to 2006, Michael Robert McEntyre, was awarded the Medal of the Order of Australia (OAM) for "service to secondary education in rural New South Wales and to school sport through Rugby League coaching and administrative roles."

== Notable alumni ==
- Kylea Tink – Independent Member of the Australian House of Representatives for North Sydney.
- Kyle Turner – Former rugby league player for South Sydney Rabbitohs.

== See also ==
- List of government schools in New South Wales
- Education in Australia
