= Kyle Turner (rugby league) =

Australian rugby league footballer (1992–2023)

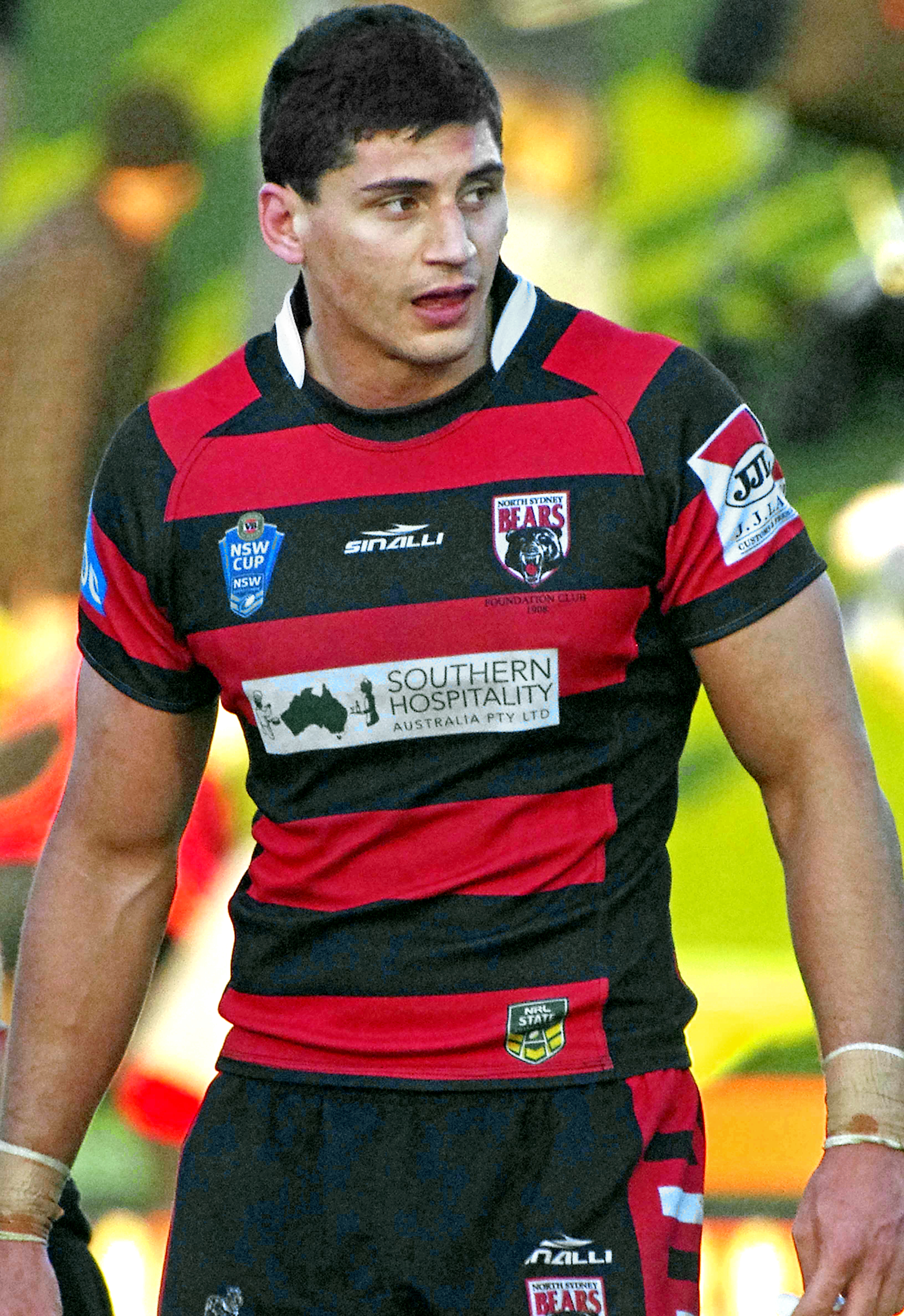

Personal information
- Born: Kyle Turner; 20 February 1992 Sydney, Australia
- Died: 18 August 2023 (aged 31) Coonabarabran, New South Wales, Australia

Playing information
- Height: 190 cm (6 ft 3 in)
- Weight: 103 kg (16 st 3 lb)
- Position: Second-row, lock, centre
Club
| Years | Team | Pld | T | G | FG | P |
|---|---|---|---|---|---|---|
| 2014–19 | South Sydney | 91 | 13 | 0 | 0 | 52 |
Representative
| Years | Team | Pld | T | G | FG | P |
| 2015 | Indigenous All Stars | 1 | 0 | 0 | 0 | 0 |
| 2017 | NSW Country | 1 | 0 | 0 | 0 | 0 |
- Source: As of 3 September 2019

Kyle Turner (20 February 1992 – 18 August 2023) was an Australian professional rugby league footballer who played as a second-row, lock and centre for the South Sydney Rabbitohs in the National Rugby League (NRL).

Turner also played for the Indigenous All Stars and Country NSW, and he played in the Rabbitohs' 2014 NRL Grand Final winning team.

== Background ==
Turner's hometown was Coonabarabran, New South Wales. He was of Kamilaroi (Indigenous Australian) descent and played his junior rugby league for the Coonabarabran Unicorns, before being signed by the South Sydney Rabbitohs. When he was younger, he played for the New South Wales Indigenous Under-16s team.

In 2011 and 2012, Turner played for the South Sydney Rabbitohs' NYC team before moving on to the Rabbitohs' New South Wales Cup team, North Sydney Bears in 2013. On 1 March 2013, Turner re-signed with the Rabbitohs on a two-year contract to the end of the 2015 season.

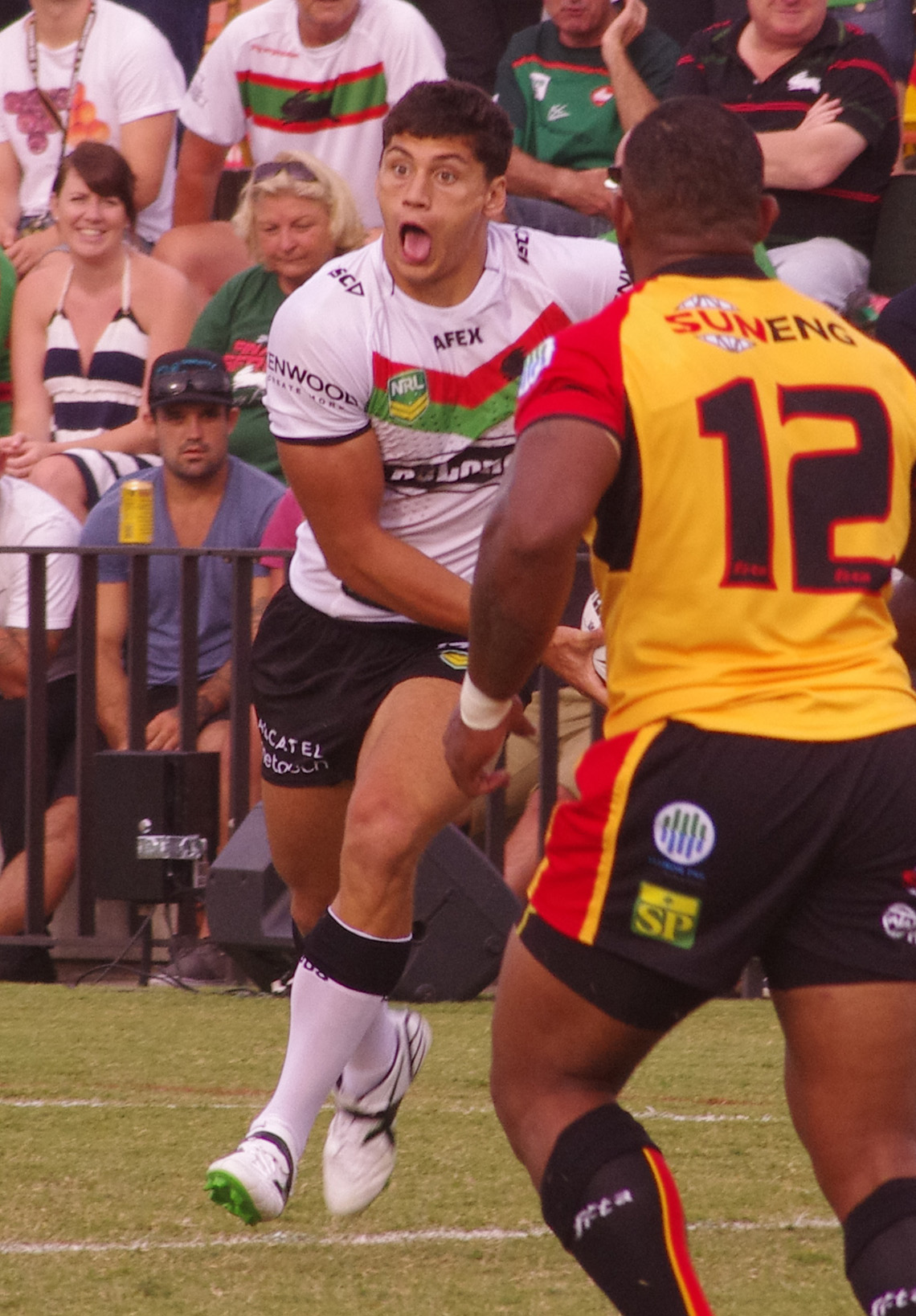
Turner playing for the Rabbitohs in 2013

== Playing career ==
=== 2014 ===
In round 3 of the 2014 NRL season, Turner made his NRL debut for Souths against the Wests Tigers, playing off the interchange bench in South Sydney's 16–25 loss at ANZ Stadium. In round 6 against the Penrith Panthers, he scored his first NRL career try in South Sydney's 18–2 win at Penrith Stadium. On 5 October, he played off the interchange bench in South Sydney's 2014 NRL Grand Final win over the Canterbury-Bankstown Bulldogs. He finished the 2014 season having playing 25 matches and scoring six tries.

=== 2015 ===
On 31 January and 1 February, Turner played for Souths in their winning 2015 NRL Auckland Nines campaign. On 13 February, he played for the Indigenous All Stars against the NRL All Stars in the 2015 All Stars match. During the game, he seriously injured his neck after being tackled by Paul Gallen. The injury forced him to undergo disc replacement surgery.

Turner was sidelined for the first 20 rounds of the 2015 NRL season, before returning in round 21 against the Penrith Panthers, playing off the interchange bench. During the game, he was concussed in a tackle and taken off the field for the remainder of the game in Souths 20–16 win at ANZ Stadium. He finished the 2015 season having played in six matches for Souths. On 8 October, he re-signed with Souths on a 2-year contract.

=== 2016 ===
In February, Turner played for Souths in the 2016 NRL Auckland Nines. He finished the season playing in 23 matches, scoring three tries.

=== 2017 ===
Turner made 21 appearances for Souths in the 2017 NRL season scoring one try. Turner was selected to play in the last City vs Country match, representing Country NSW.

=== 2018 ===
Turner only made one appearance for Souths in the 2018 season coming off the bench in their 26–14 victory over arch rivals Eastern Suburbs. Turner spent the remainder of the season playing in reserve grade for the North Sydney Bears.

=== 2019 ===
Under new coach Wayne Bennett, Turner made a return to the first grade team and made 16 more appearances for Souths as the club finished in third place for the 2019 regular season. On 10 September, it was revealed that Turner was being released by Souths at the end of the season due to salary cap constraints.

=== 2020 ===
Following his rejection of an offer from the Queanbeyan Kangaroos Turner retired from rugby league and returned to his hometown of Coonabarabran.

=== 2021 ===
In 2021, he made a surprise comeback with the Coonabarabran Unicorns. He was also a physical education teacher at Coonabarabran High School, the same school he formerly attended.

== Death ==
Turner died from unknown causes in the town of Coonabarabran on 18 August 2023.
