= St Matthews Anglican Church, Grovely =

St Matthews Anglican Church
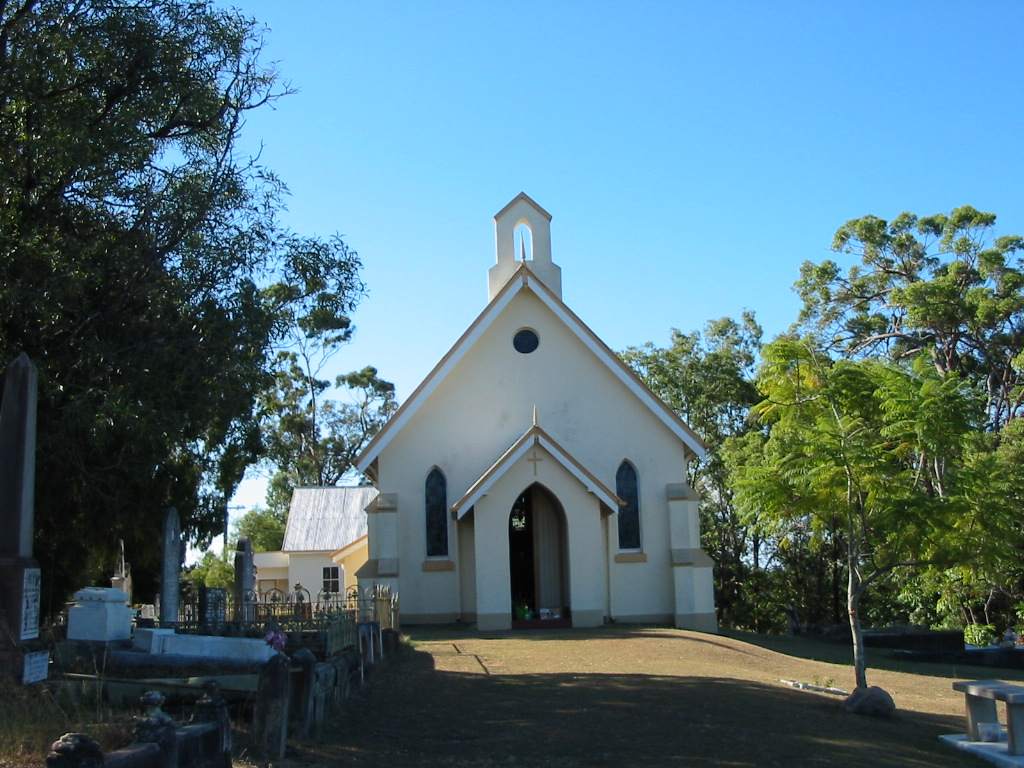
- St Matthews Anglican Church, 2011

- Location within Queensland
- 27.409°S 152.968°E
- Location: 35 Church Road, Mitchelton, City of Brisbane, Queensland, Australia

History
- Design period: 1840s–1860s (mid-19th century)
- Built: 1867–1980s

Site notes
- Architect: Charles Tiffin

Queensland Heritage Register
- Official name: St Matthews Anglican Church, Grovely Church
- Type: state heritage (landscape, built)
- Designated: 21 October 1992
- Reference no.: 600256
- Significant period: 1867–1869, 1914, 1917, 1980s (fabric); 1909, 1920, 1947 (historical)
- Significant components: memorial – plaque, hall, memorial – window, memorial – gate/s, furniture/fittings, church, post/s – bell, trees/plantings, cemetery, stained glass window/s
- Builders: Mr Mahoney

St Matthews Anglican Church is a heritage-listed church and cemetery at 35 Church Road, Mitchelton, City of Brisbane, Queensland, Australia. It was designed by Charles Tiffin and built from 1867 to 1869 by Mr Mahoney. It is also known as Grovely Church, as it is within the Parish of Grovely (a former Brisbane suburb name). It was added to the Queensland Heritage Register on 21 October 1992.

== History ==
The land was owned by John and Mary Nicholson, landed gentry from Wiltshire, England who emigrated to Queensland in 1864 and established themselves at Groveley Farm (later Groveley Lodge), Upper Kedron (the extra 'e' in Groveley was dropped in later years). As there was no church in the area and being dedicated Anglicans, they established church services and a Sunday school in their home. Early in 1867 they approached Bishop Edward Tufnell for permission to build a local church. The Nicholsons provided the hill-top land and much of the capital while other settlers provided their time and materials. Somewhat unusually the land was not given to the church, but was placed into a private trust. Public subscription was raised to provide funds to build a church.

The Nicholsons had approached the Queensland Colonial Architect Charles Tiffin to design a simple timber church to accommodate approximately 130 persons. This design was approved at a meeting of interested Upper Kedron residents held in March 1866, but it was proposed also that local brickmakers (a number of whom had moved to the district in the mid-1860s) be approached to donate bricks for the construction. Tenders were called in April 1867 through the office of the Church of England Diocesan Architect, Richard George Suter, for a church of brick and stone. Mr Mahoney was appointed the contractor.

The foundation stone for St Matthew's Anglican Church was laid on 23 September 1867 by Governor George Bowen and the first service was held on 7 February 1869. The church was never blessed or consecrated (perhaps because the land was not given to the church). However, it has been used for baptisms, burials and marriages since 1869. In 1885 John's brother, William Castlemaine Nicholson, converted ownership of the land and church buildings to trustees and they are still privately owned.

The church was known as Grovely Church until 1909 when it was given the name of St Matthew's. In 1914 the bell presented by Howard S Bliss was erected on the bell-post. The church hall was built in 1917, fifty years after the laying of the foundation stone.

St Matthew's became a parochial district in 1920 and the vicarage was built in 1926. The Rev ED Eglinton raised the status of the district to a parish and in December 1947 he was inducted as the first rector of the parish of Grovely. Recently a lichgate was erected to honour a descendant of one of the pioneering families.

John and Mary Nicholson are buried in the churchyard cemetery.

== Description ==
The listing on the Queensland Heritage Register comprises all of the buildings, structures, sites, objects, planting and land with the exception of the rectory, which has been altered substantially. The buildings are all painted the same colour and are in good condition. The graveyard is well tendered.

=== The church ===
The church (built 1867–1869) is a simple Gothic-styled brick building located high on a hill. It is rectangular in shape, as are the skillion vestry and gabled porch. Rendered walls of hand-made bricks are supported by buttresses and rest on stone foundations. The steeply pitched gabled roof has corrugated iron laid over the original shingles. A bellcote surmounts the front gable. The porch and vestry doorways and windows are lancet shaped.

Internal walls are painted and the lined roof is supported by exposed beams and trusses. The red cedar pews are original. Over the years memorials have been added, including a commemorative plaque presented in 1917 in memory of the Nicholson's son drowned in Mackay in 1882.

Alterations include external render and boarding over of the trefoil window above the porch. Additions include stained glass memorial windows, an altar and other ecclesiastical furniture, raised sanctuary and chancel steps, nave carpet, lighting and other modern facilities.

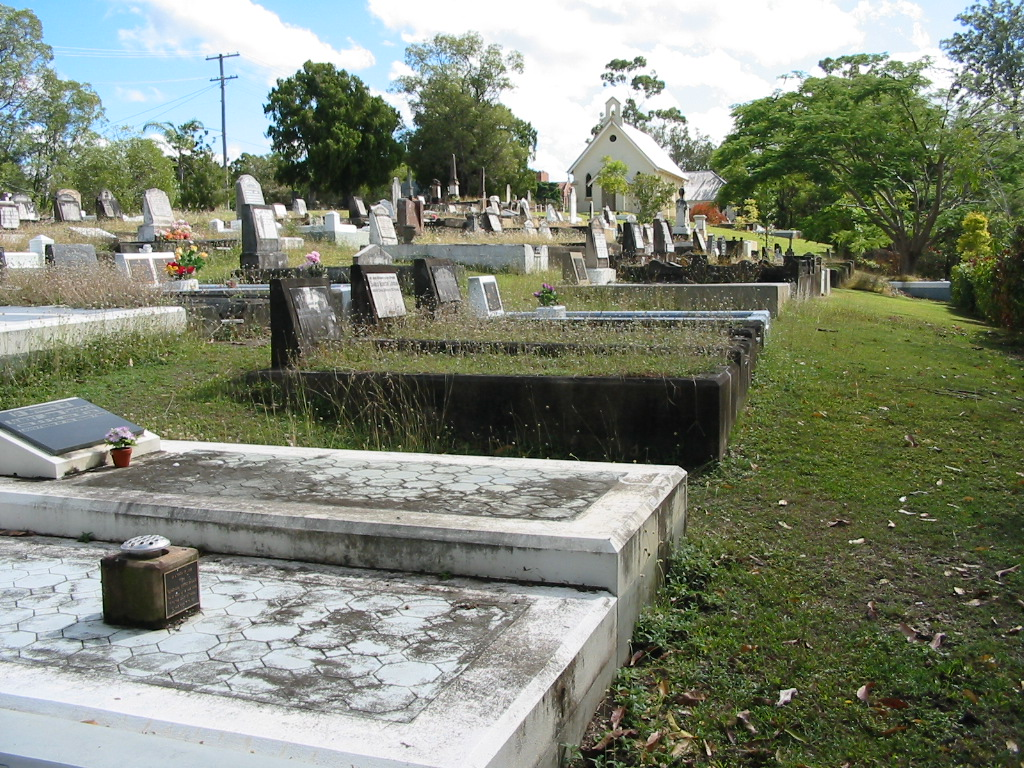
Cemetery, 2005

=== The cemetery ===
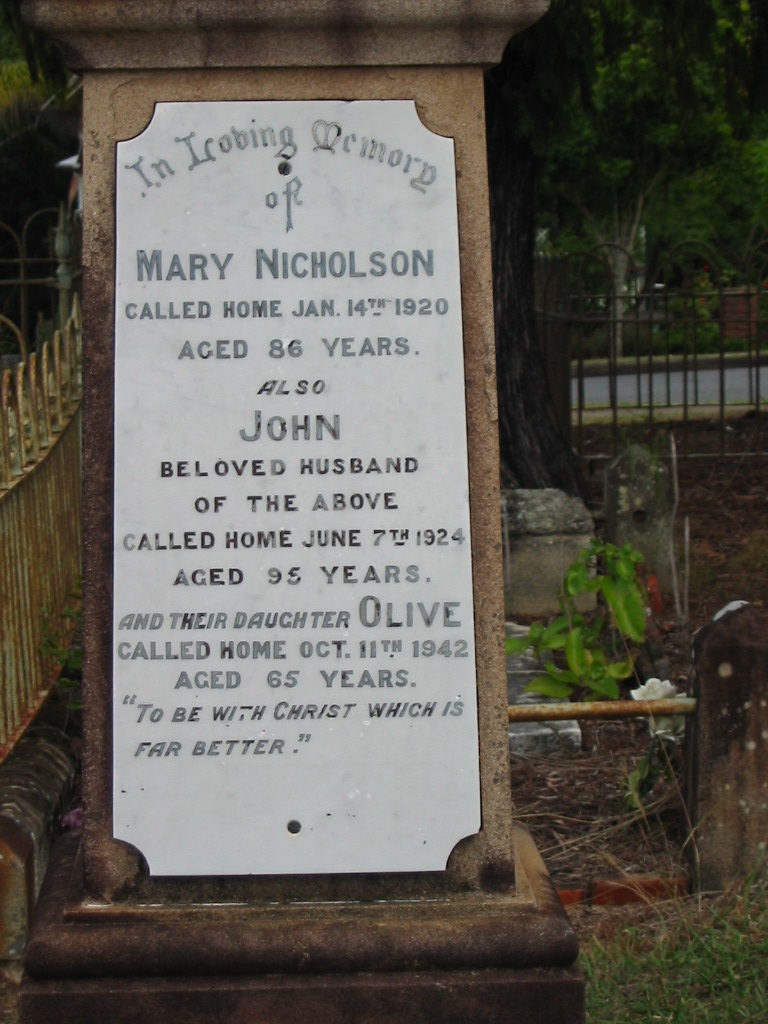
Headstone for John and Mary Nicholson

The cemetery (used since 1869) holds the graves of many of the early settlers of the Grovely/Upper Kedron district including members of the Nicholson family. Monument styles vary, illustrating changing public tastes since 1869.

=== The bell post ===
The bell post (built 1914), comprising a bell which hangs in a cast-iron frame on a timber post. It has rusted and is no longer used.

=== The hall ===
The hall (built 1917) is a simple timber and corrugated iron building with skillion roof. It is built on stumps and is highset at the back. The steeply pitched roof is hipped at the back and gabled at the front. The entrance porch has a parapet.

=== The rectory ===
The rectory (built 1926) is a timber dwelling on stumps. It has a short-ridge corrugated iron roof and is verandah on two sides. The dwelling has been refurbished by various occupants to suit their needs, and is not included in the heritage listing.

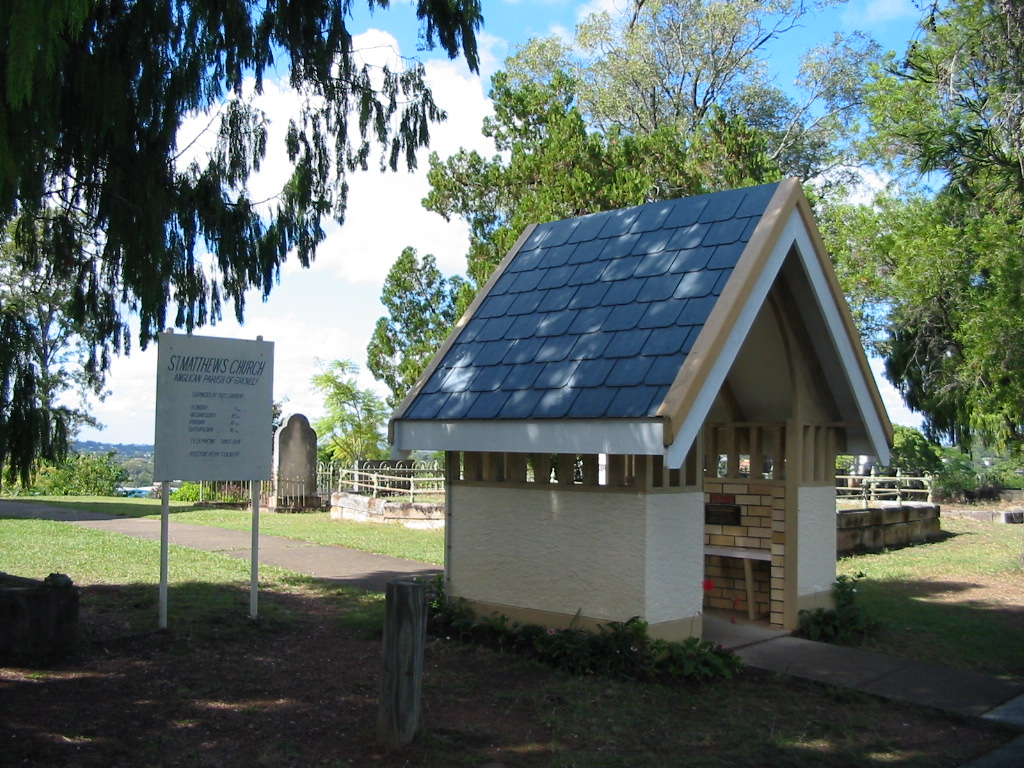
Lychgate, 2005

=== The lychgate ===
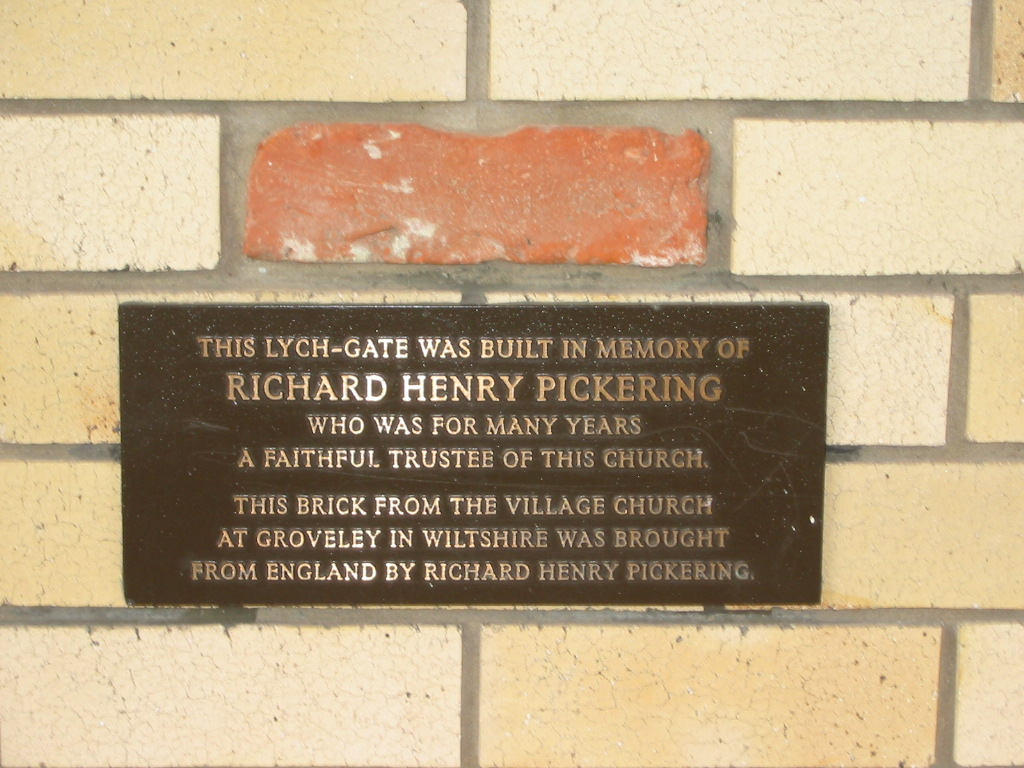
Plaque on the lych gate, 2005

The lychgate (built 1980s), a memorial to Richard Henry Pickering, a trustee of the church, who died in 1976. The gable roof has fibrous cement shingles, while the sides are half stuccoed brick and half carved timber. The open sides repeat the Gothic lancet arch.

== Heritage listing ==
St Matthews Anglican Church was listed on the Queensland Heritage Register on 21 October 1992 having satisfied the following criteria.

The place is important in demonstrating the evolution or pattern of Queensland's history.

St Matthew's Anglican Church, completed in 1869, is significant historically as one of the oldest parish churches in the Brisbane region, and the church and cemetery in particular are a significant creation of, and memorial to, the pioneer families of Grovely/Upper Kedron/Mitchelton. The 1917 hall is illustrative of the development of the area in the first two decades of the 20th century, culminating in St Matthew's becoming a parochial district in 1920.

The place demonstrates rare, uncommon or endangered aspects of Queensland's cultural heritage.

St Matthew's Anglican Church is significant also as a rare Queensland example of an Anglican church group, comprising church, cemetery and hall, which is still privately owned and unconsecrated.

The place is important in demonstrating the principal characteristics of a particular class of cultural places.

The church remains substantially intact, with the original red cedar pews retained, and is significant in illustrating the principal characteristics of a small brick church of the late 1860s, comparatively few of which were constructed in Queensland.

The place is important because of its aesthetic significance.

The church is significant aesthetically for its picturesque quality and setting, simplicity of design and materials, and craftsmanship, and both church and cemetery command a significant townscape presence in the Mitchelton/Grovely area.

The place has a strong or special association with a particular community or cultural group for social, cultural or spiritual reasons.

St Matthew's Anglican Church has a special association for the Anglican congregation of the Grovely/Mitchelton area, which has worshipped at that church since 1869.
