= Frederick Pratt (minister) =

Australian-born Congregational church minister

The Reverend Frederick Vicary Pratt (9 April 1870 – 25 April 1932) was an Australian-born Congregational church minister who served as chairman of the State Congregational Unions of New South Wales (1906–07), South Australia (1909-10) and Victoria (1914–15). He maintained that Australians could hold their own against the world in art, scholarship and sport and believed that Australia would at some time produce a national religious reformer attuned to local conditions.

== Early life and family ==
Pratt was born at Petersham, New South Wales, the seventh child of William Pratt, an English-born pharmacist. He was educated at Newington College commencing in 1883 and in 1888 he won the Wigram Allen Scholarship, endowed by Sir George Wigram Allen, for general proficiency. At the end of 1888 Pratt was named Dux of the college and received the Schofield Scholarship. He went up to the University of Sydney and in 1889 graduated as a Bachelor of Arts in 1892 and a Master of Arts in 1897 with first-class honours in Latin and the university gold medal for logic and mental philosophy. After visiting the other colonies and New Zealand as the travelling secretary of the Student Christian Movement, Pratt studied theology at Camden College and was ordained in 1897. He married Agnes Elizabeth Waddell in the year of his ordination.

== Ministry ==
He served as a minister at the Katoomba, New South Wales, Congregational Church from 1897 to 1907 and the Angaston, South Australia, Congregational Church from 1907 until 1910. He moved to Victoria as minister of Wyclif Congregational Church in Surrey Hills serving from 1910 until 1916 when he went to Brisbane, Queensland. He returned to Sydney and the Vaucluse church in 1917 and Hunters Hill in 1918 before a three-year ministry in Davey Street Hobart, Tasmania. Pratt's final ministry was at the Roseby Memorial Church in Marrickville, New South Wales from 1928 until his death in 1932. He was survived by his wife, daughter and four sons.

Awards
Preceded by William Parker	Schofield Scholarship; Dux of Newington College; 1888	Succeeded by Charles Halliday
