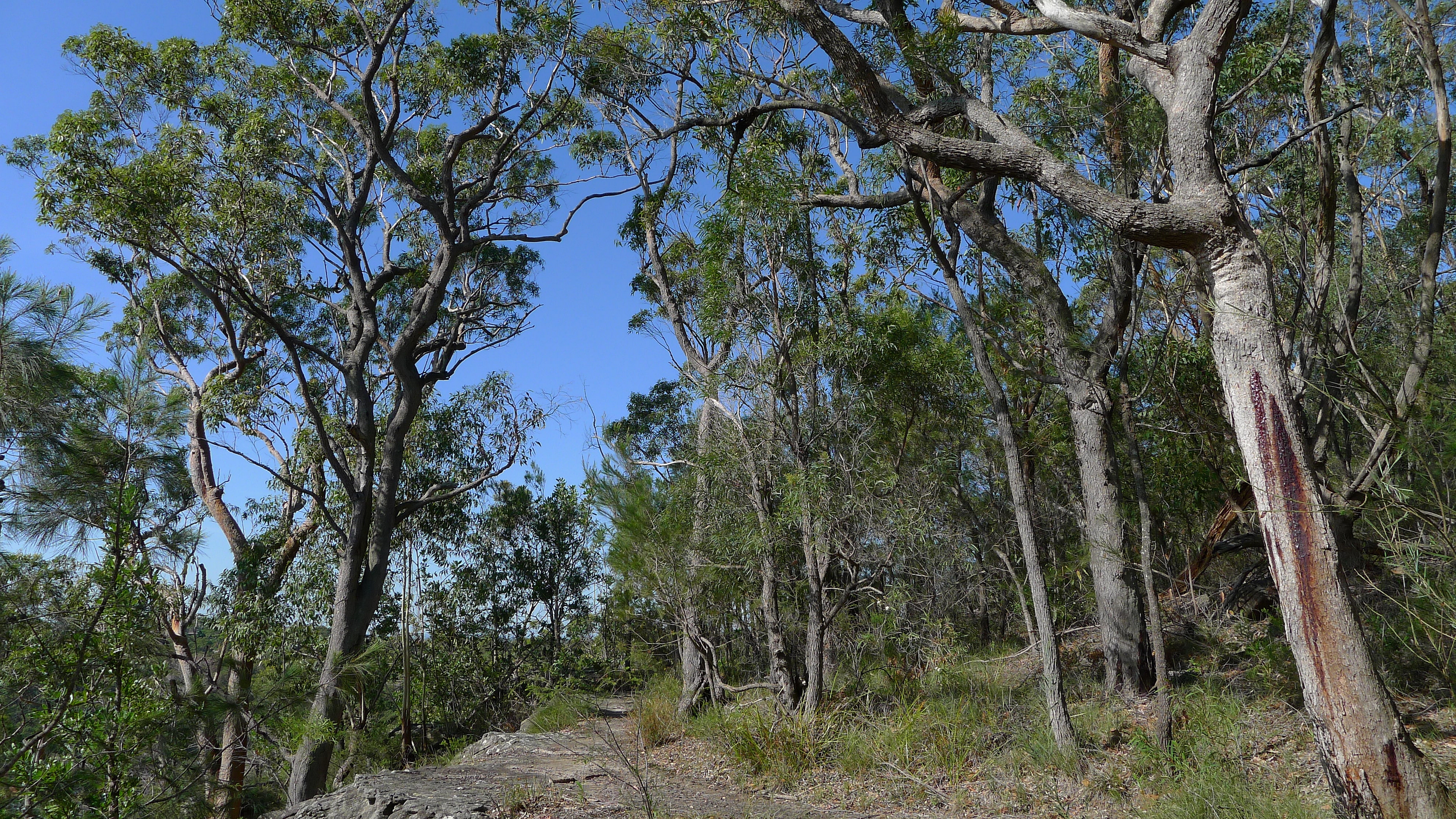

Conservation status
- Least Concern (IUCN 3.1)

Scientific classification
- Kingdom: Plantae
- Clade: Tracheophytes
- Clade: Angiosperms
- Clade: Eudicots
- Clade: Rosids
- Order: Myrtales
- Family: Myrtaceae
- Genus: Angophora
- Species: A. bakeri

Binomial name
- Angophora bakeri E.C.Hall
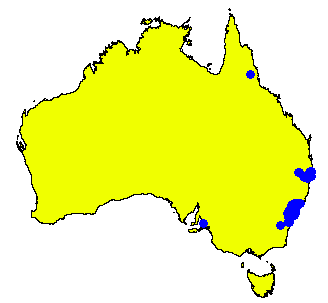
- Occurrence data from AVH

= Angophora bakeri =

Narrow-leaved apple

Species of tree

Angophora bakeri, commonly known as the narrow-leaved apple, is a species of tree that is endemic to New South Wales. It has rough, fibrous bark on the trunk and branches, lance-shaped adult leaves, flower buds in groups of three or seven, white or creamy white flowers and oval to cylindrical fruit.

== Description ==
Angophora bakeri is a tree that typically grows to a height of 10–18 m (33–59 ft) and forms a lignotuber. It has rough, fibrous grey bark on the trunk and branches. Young plants and coppice regrowth have linear to narrow lance-shaped leaves that are more or less sessile, 50–100 mm (2.0–3.9 in) long, 4–10 mm (0.16–0.39 in) wide and arranged in opposite pairs. Adult leaves are thin, glossy green, paler on the lower surface, linear to narrow lance-shaped, 60–130 mm (2.4–5.1 in) long, 5–10 mm (0.2–0.4 in) wide on a petiole 3–10 mm (0.1–0.4 in) long, and arranged in opposite pairs. The flower buds are arranged on the ends of branchlets in groups of three or seven on a peduncle 7–18 mm (0.3–0.7 in) long, the individual buds on pedicels 4–11 mm (0.2–0.4 in) long. Mature buds are 4–5 mm (0.16–0.20 in) long and 4–6 mm (0.16–0.24 in) wide. There are five sepals up to 1 mm (0.04 in) long and the petals are about 3 mm (0.1 in) long and wide. Flowering occurs from December to February and the flowers are white or creamy white. The fruit is an oval to cylindrical, pale brown or grey capsule 8–10 mm (0.3–0.4 in) long and wide with ribbed sides.

== Taxonomy and naming ==
Angophora bakeri was first formally described in 1913 by Edwin Cuthbert Hall in the Journal and Proceedings of the Royal Society of New South Wales. The specific epithet honours Richard Thomas Baker.

In 1986, G.J.Leach described two subspecies in the journalTelopea and the names have been accepted by the Australian Plant Census:

- Angophora bakeri subsp. bakeri has thin, flexible leaves and is widely distributed;
- Angophora bakeri subsp. crassifolia G.J.Leach has rigid, relatively thick leaves and is mostly only known from the Ku-ring-gai Chase National Park.

== Distribution and habitat ==
Narrow-leaved apple grows in sandy soil over sandstone and is widespread and locally abundant from Port Stephens to Nowra and as far west as Katoomba. There is also a disjunct population, previously known as Angophora exul, now a synonym of A. bakeri subsp. bakeri in the Gibraltar Range National Park.

== Conservation status ==
The IUCN Red List assesses the species as Least Concern.

== Gallery ==
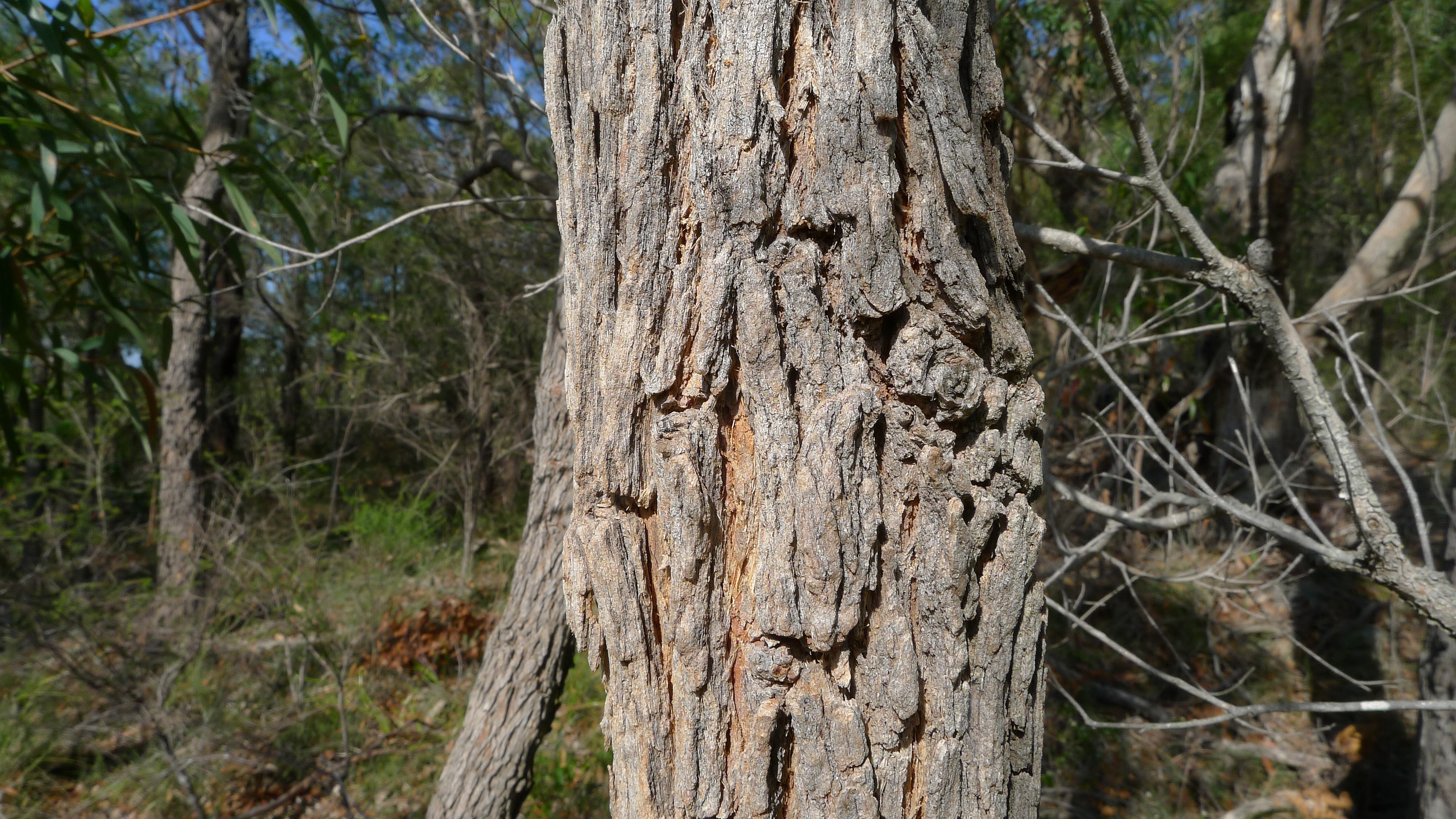
Bark

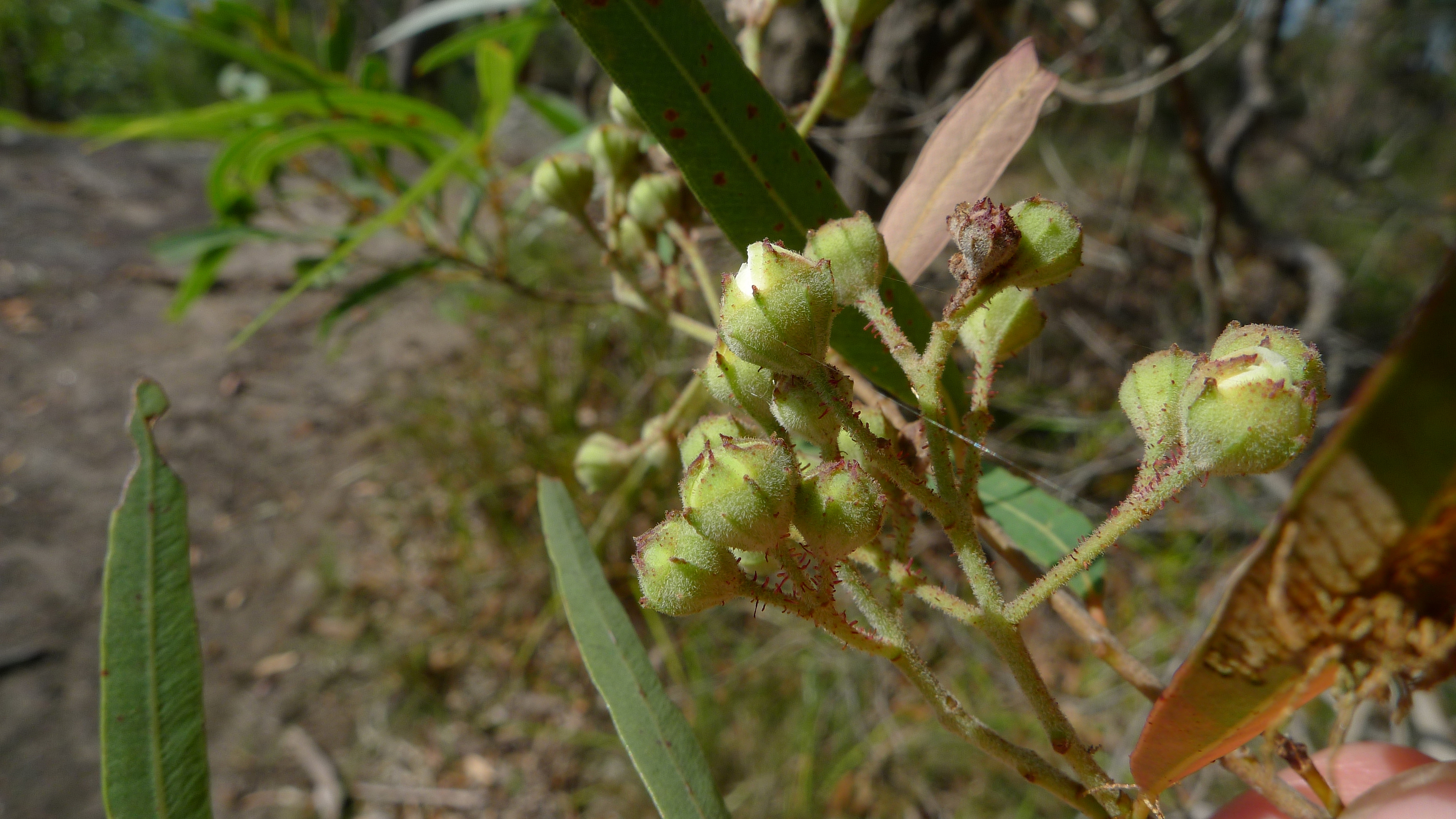
Buds

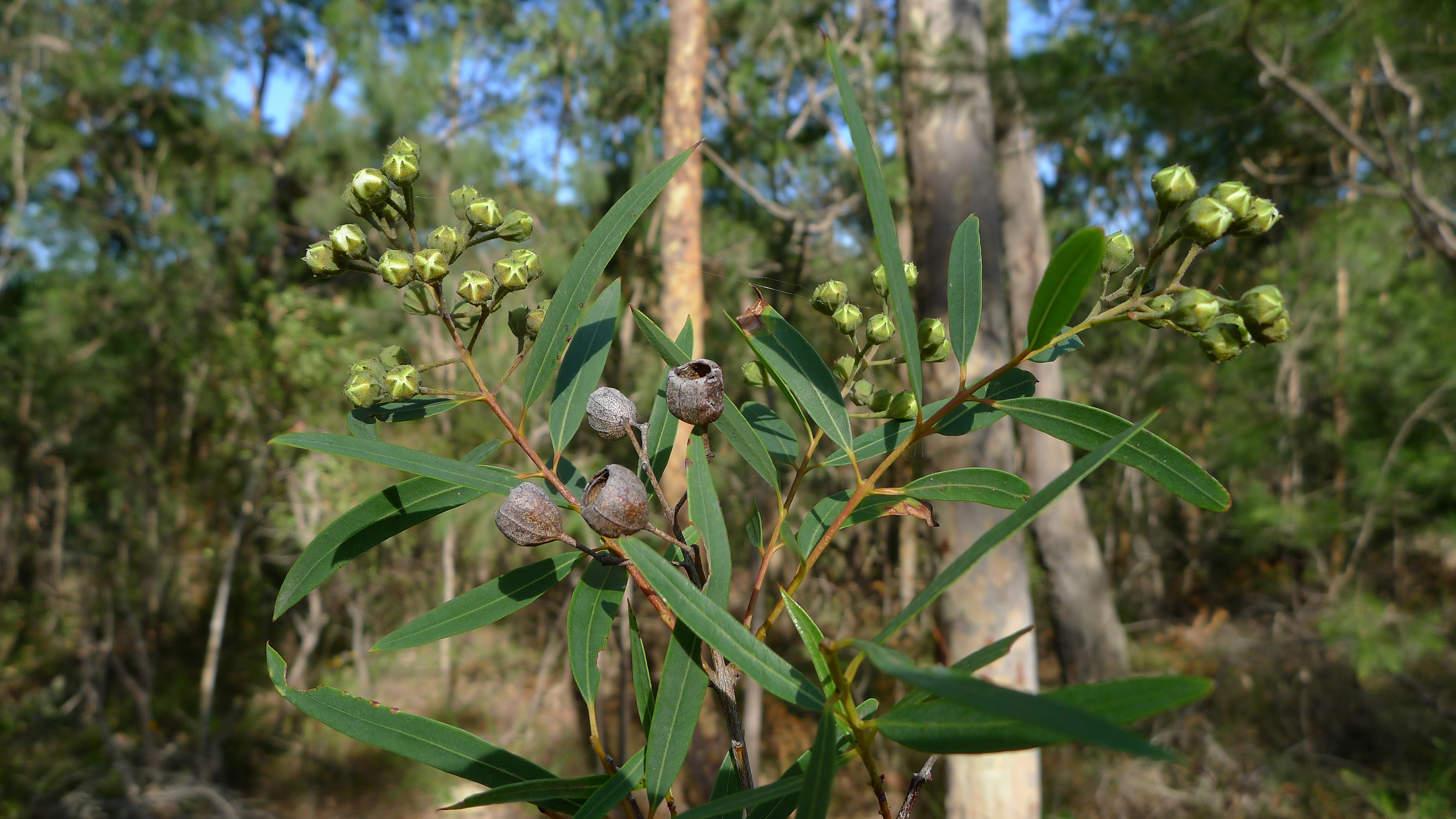
Buds, foliage and old seed pods

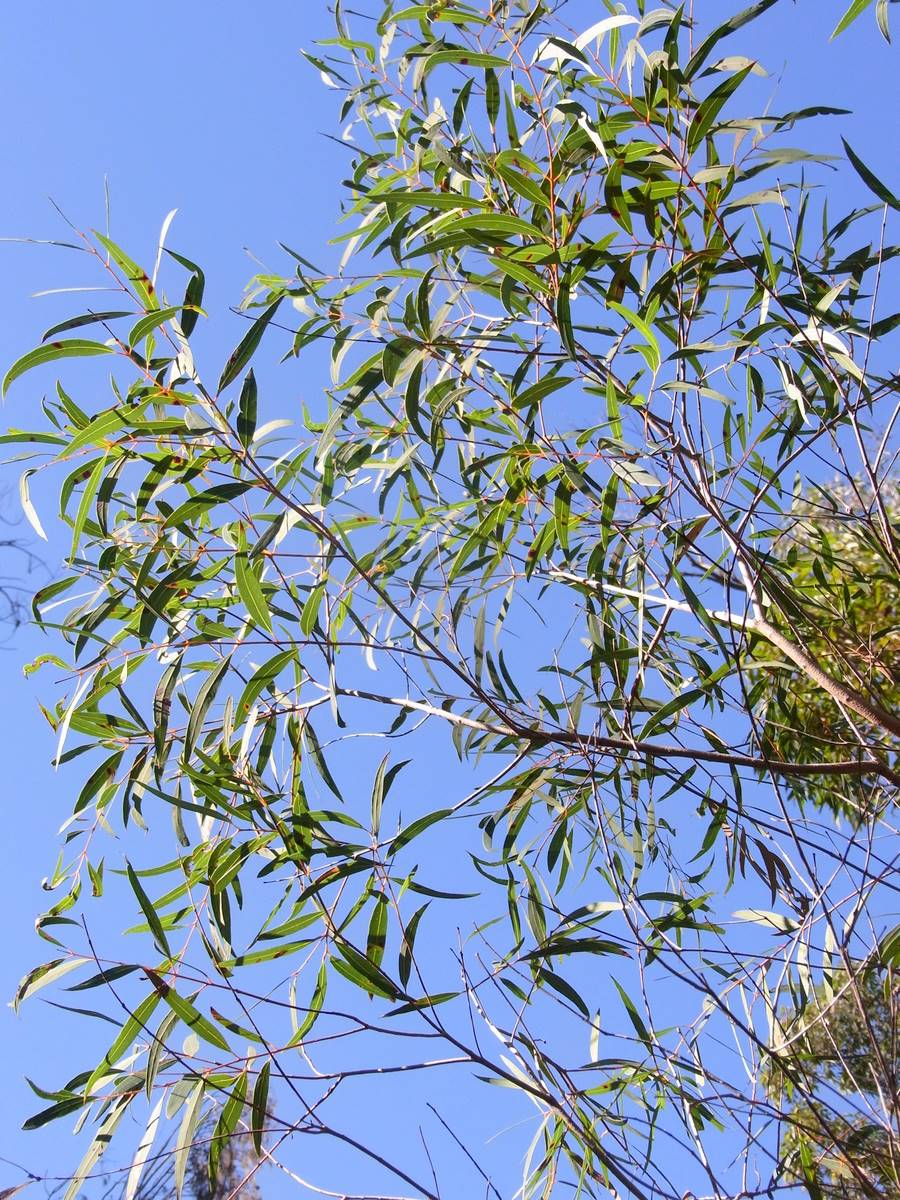
Foliage

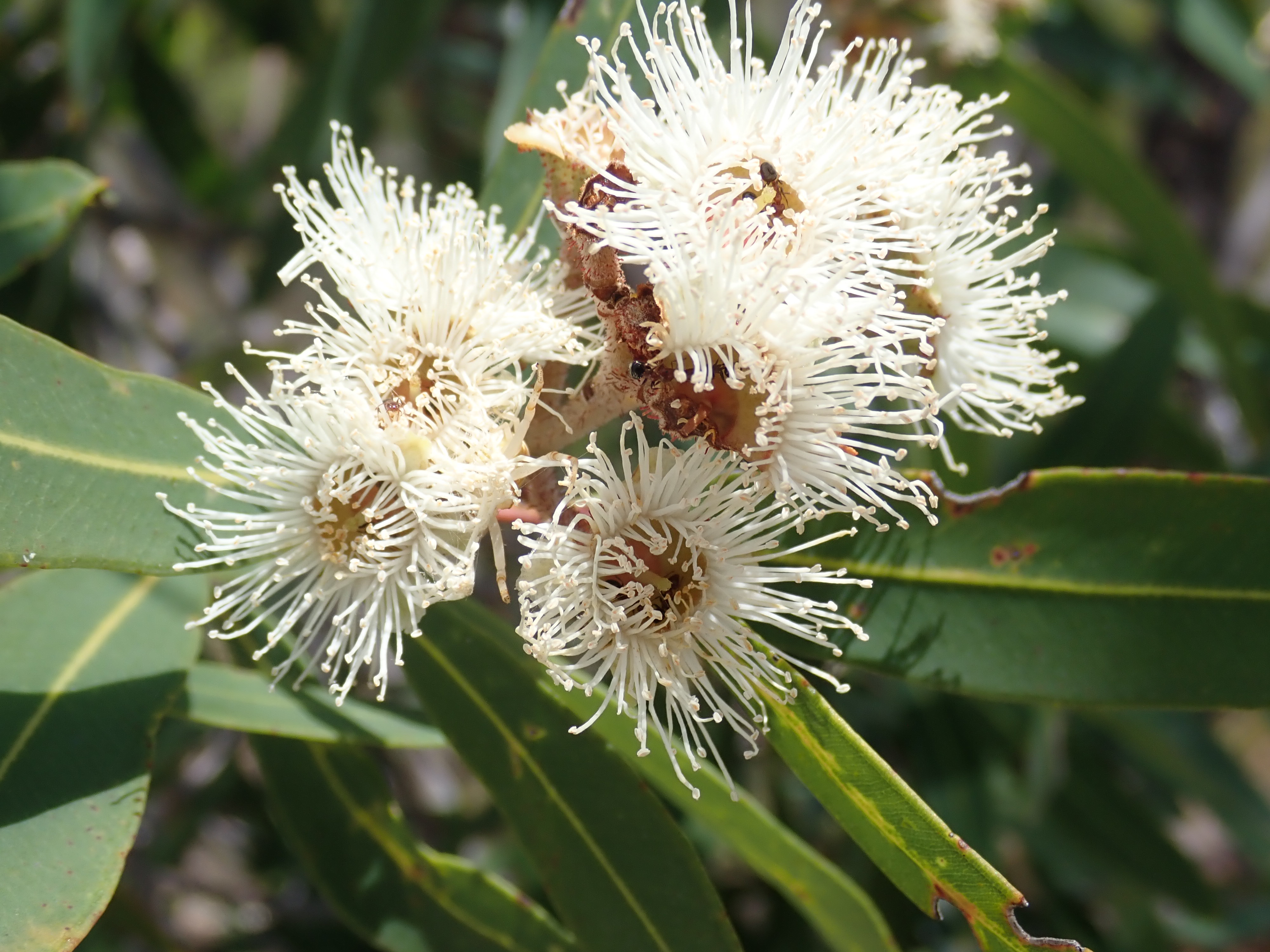
Flowers
