= Coonabarabran =

- Town
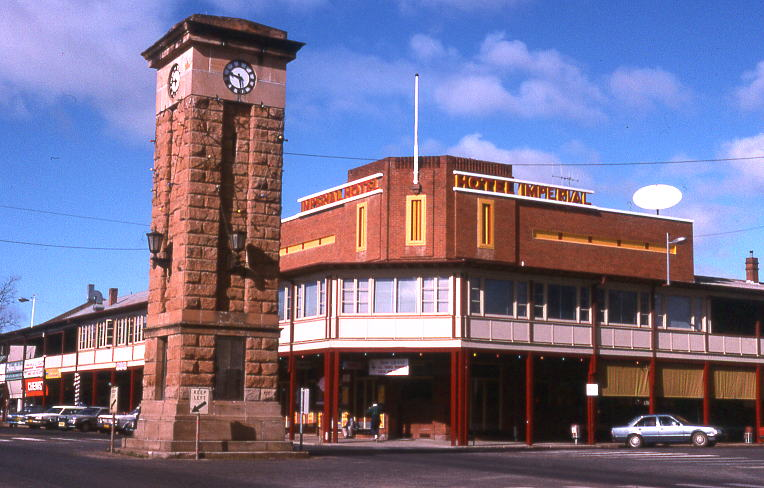
- Town centre/Imperial Hotel

- Coordinates: 31°15′S 149°16′E
- Country: Australia
- State: New South Wales
- LGA: Warrumbungle Shire
- Location: 451 km (280 mi) NW of Sydney; 161 km (100 mi) NE of Dubbo; 182 km (113 mi) W of Tamworth; 120 km (75 mi) SW of Narrabri; 84 km (52 mi) NE of Gilgandra

Government
  - State electorate: Barwon
  - Federal division: Parkes
- Elevation: 505 m (1,657 ft)

Population
  - Total: 2,387 (2021 census)
- Postcode: 2357
- County: Gowen
- Mean max temp: 23.7 °C (74.7 °F)
- Mean min temp: 7.4 °C (45.3 °F)
- Annual rainfall: 748.4 mm (29.46 in)

Coonabarabran (/kuːnəbærəbrən/) is a town in Warrumbungle Shire that sits on the divide between the Central West and North West Slopes regions of New South Wales, Australia. At the 2021 census, the town had a population of 2,387, and as of 2021, the population of Coonabarabran and its surrounding area is 3,477. Local and district residents refer to the town as 'Coona'. Coonabarabran is the gateway to the Warrumbungle National Park, Siding Spring Observatory and the Pilliga Forest.

== Etymology ==
The origin of the name Coonabarabran is unconfirmed. It may derive from a person's name or from the Kamilaroi language word 'gunbaraaybaa' meaning 'excrement', translated earlier as meaning, 'peculiar odour', this is possibly a bowdlerisation.

Another possible meaning is derived from the Wiradjuri word for an inquisitive person, ‘gunabaraburan’. 'Coolabarabran' was the name of a station owned by James Weston in 1848.

== History ==
The area around Coonabarabran and the Warrumbungles has been occupied by the Kamilaroi people for approximately 7,500 years. In 1818, the area was opened up for European settlement, when the surveyor-general for the Colony of New South Wales, John Oxley, made an expedition through the north-west areas of the colony. Oxley surveyed the area around the Warrumbungles mountain range, which he named the "Arbuthnot Range".

The former convict, James Weston (1800–1883), who was assigned to the Cassilis area in the Upper Hunter Region before being granted his freedom in 1843, acquired the agricultural area known as "Coolabarbyan" in the district in 1843. Weston was among the first permanent settlers in the district, cultivating 20 acres of wheat and constructing a water-powered mill to make flour from his crops on the southern bank of the Castlereagh River (now Neilson Park), being appointed postmaster in 1849, and establishing the first inn, the "Castlereagh Inn" in the early 1850s. In 1859, the town was first surveyed by Lewis Gordon, with the first sale of land recorded in 1859. European settlement continued to grow from the 1860s, as the wheat industry moved from coastal areas to further inland, encouraged by the Robertson Land Acts. A Police watch house was completed in 1857, and the first Court House was completed in 1861. The Village of Coonabarabran was gazetted on 2 May 1860. In 1870, the Public School was opened. After construction of a new stone courthouse in 1878 the original courthouse was demolished and a post and telegraph office constructed on its site in 1879.

The Coonabarabran Shire was proclaimed on 7 March 1906, with the enactment of the Local Government (Shires) Act 1905. With incorporation, the town continued to grow with the construction of the railway line through Binnaway to Coonabarabran in 1917 (extended to Baradine and Gwabegar in 1923) and the establishment of the Forestry Commission in 1916, both of which facilitated the growth of agriculture and forestry as the primary industries of the region.

In 1926–1928, a local committee organised the development of the town memorial to the First World War in the form of the Coonabarabran Memorial Clock Tower at the central town intersection of John Street and Dalgarno Street. Built from local sandstone by Edmund Pye of Gunnedah at a cost of £1,300, the clock tower was officially dedicated on 23 August 1928 by Major General Charles Frederick Cox.

== Heritage listings ==
Coonabarabran has a number of heritage-listed sites, including those listed on the New South Wales State Heritage Register (SHR), State Government Agency Section 170 Registers (s.170), and the Warrumbungle Local Environmental Plan (LEP). The first heritage listings occurred under the now-defunct national Register of the National Estate in 1978, and the Coonabarabran Local Environmental Plan 1990, but no further local level studies have been undertaken since.

- Coonabarabran Railway Precinct (s.170)
- Dalgarno Street: Coonabarabran General Cemetery (LEP)
- John and Dalgarno streets: Coonabarabran Clock Tower (LEP)
- John and Dalgarno streets: Coonabarabran Courthouse (LEP & s.170)
- Main Road, 55: Flags Inn Site (LEP; Archaeological)
- Oxley Highway: Burra Bee Dee Mission and Cemetery (SHR & LEP)
- 4 km west of Bulgaldie: Chalk Mountain Area (LEP)

== Demographics ==
Historical population
Year	Pop.	±%
1954	2,210	—
1961	2,547	+15.2%
1966	2,793	+9.7%
1971	3,055	+9.4%
1976	3,068	+0.4%
1981	3,001	−2.2%
1986	3,033	+1.1%
1991	2,959	−2.4%
1996	3,012	+1.8%
2001	2,736	−9.2%
2006	2,609	−4.6%
2011	2,576	−1.3%
2016	2,537	−1.5%
2021	2,387	−5.9%
Source: Australian Bureau of Statistics data.

According to the 2021 Census, there were 2,387 people in Coonabarabran.

- Aboriginal and Torres Strait Islander people made up 15.8% of the population.
- 77.9% of people were born in Australia and 80.2% of people spoke only English at home.
- The most common responses for religion were No Religion 27.1%, Catholic 20.8% and Anglican 20.0%.

== Astronomy ==
Coonabarabran is the closest town to the Siding Spring Observatory, which is home to the 3.9-metre Anglo-Australian Telescope, the largest optical telescope in Australia. It is operated by the Australian Astronomical Observatory (formerly the Anglo-Australian Observatory). A dozen other telescopes are on Siding Spring Mountain, a number of which are operated by the Research School of Astronomy and Astrophysics of the Australian National University. Siding Spring is also home to the Uppsala Telescope where Robert H. McNaught discovered his now famous daylight comet C/2006 P1 in August 2006. The Mopra Telescope, which is home to a 22-metre radio telescope owned and operated by the CSIRO is also near the Siding Spring Observatory, but is operated remotely from Narrabri. A recent addition to the town was the construction of the world's largest virtual Solar System drive on the roads leading to the observatory. Coonabarabran markets itself as the "astronomy capital of Australia", many of the businesses and government buildings in the town feature astronomically themed information plaques.

== Recreation ==
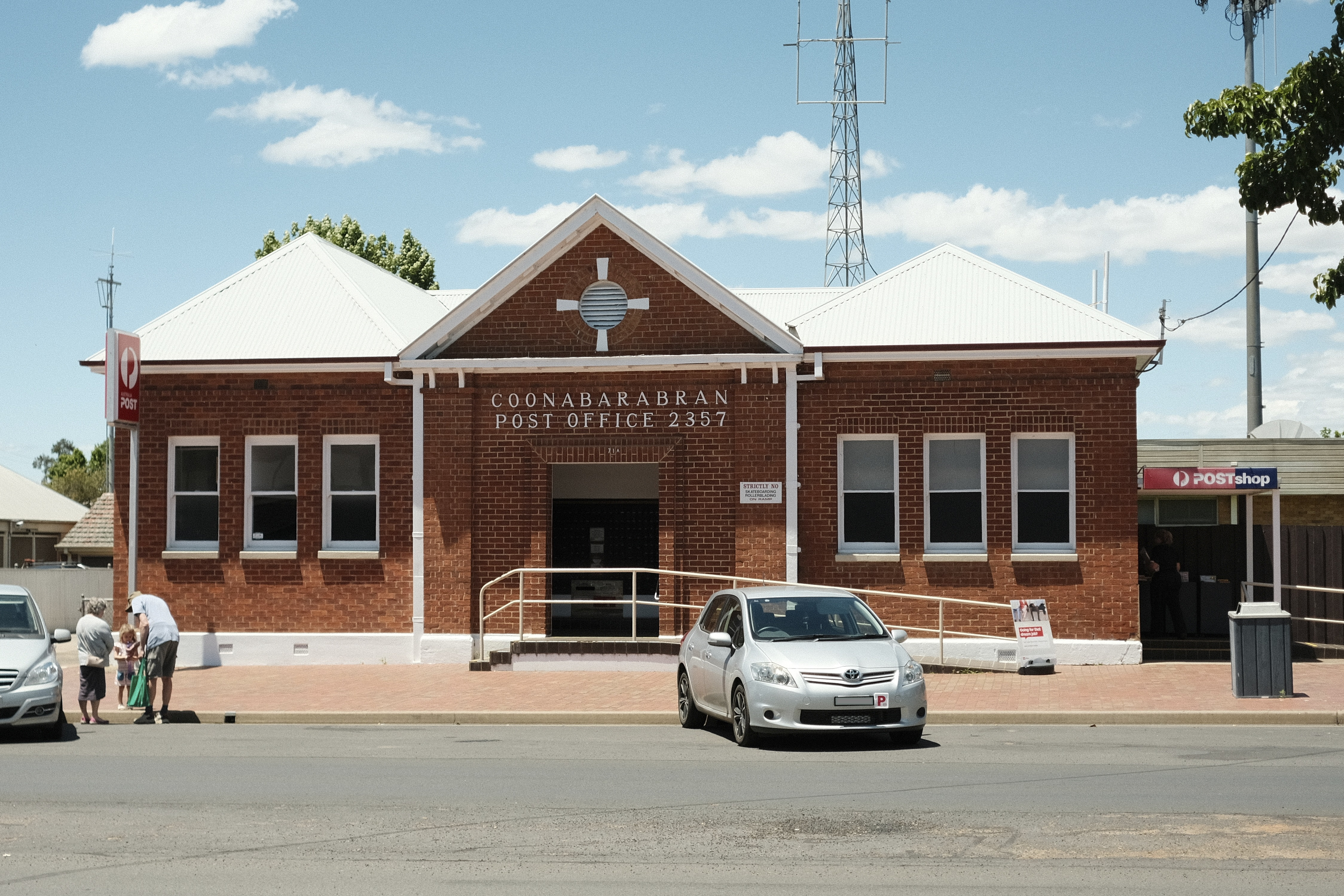
The Coonabarabran Post Office

Coonabarabran Unicorns rugby league team play in the Castlereagh Cup.

Recreation in Coonabarabran, the "Astronomy Capital of Australia," is dominated by outdoor activities centered around the Warrumbungle National Park, which is also Australia's only Dark Sky Park. Visitors flock to the area for stargazing at sites like the Siding Spring Observatory and Milroy Observatory, taking advantage of the region's clear, dark skies, high altitude, and low light pollution. Daytime recreation focuses on bushwalking and hiking through the spectacular volcanic landscape of the Warrumbungles, with popular tracks including the Breadknife and Grand High Tops walk and the Burbie Canyon walking track, alongside exploring local attractions like the Crystal Kingdom mineral exhibition and the Australian Museum Diprotodon Exhibition.

== Churches ==
The Anglican Christ Church at 94 Dalgarno Street was opened in 1939 by Bishop Arnold Wylde to a design by Lindsay Gordon Scott.

Other Churches include St. Lawrence's Catholic Church, Presbyterian Church, Uniting Church and Seventh Day Adventist Church.

== Climate ==
Coonabarabran has a subtropical climate (Köppen Cfa), with hot summers and cool winters. On average, 56.6 mornings (including 16.3 in July) fall below 0 °C or 32 °F; and in July 2002 the monthly mean minimum was as low as −3.5 °C or 25.7 °F. Rainfall is greatest from December to February with summer thunderstorms. Temperature extremes have historically ranged from 44.0 °C or 111.2 °F to −9.0 °C or 15.8 °F.

Climate data for Coonabarabran (Showgrounds, 1991–2020, extremes to 1957); 520 m AMSL; 31.28° S, 149.28° E
Month	Jan	Feb	Mar	Apr	May	Jun	Jul	Aug	Sep	Oct	Nov	Dec	Year
Record high °C (°F)	44.0 (111.2)	42.9 (109.2)	37.5 (99.5)	32.7 (90.9)	26.7 (80.1)	24.6 (76.3)	24.2 (75.6)	29.0 (84.2)	33.6 (92.5)	36.2 (97.2)	41.6 (106.9)	41.5 (106.7)	44.0 (111.2)
Mean daily maximum °C (°F)	32.0 (89.6)	30.6 (87.1)	28.0 (82.4)	24.1 (75.4)	19.6 (67.3)	16.1 (61.0)	15.5 (59.9)	17.4 (63.3)	21.0 (69.8)	24.5 (76.1)	27.6 (81.7)	30.1 (86.2)	23.9 (75.0)
Mean daily minimum °C (°F)	15.8 (60.4)	15.2 (59.4)	11.7 (53.1)	6.9 (44.4)	3.3 (37.9)	1.4 (34.5)	0.3 (32.5)	0.4 (32.7)	3.7 (38.7)	7.2 (45.0)	11.0 (51.8)	13.5 (56.3)	7.5 (45.6)
Record low °C (°F)	3.6 (38.5)	3.6 (38.5)	0.6 (33.1)	−3.6 (25.5)	−6.1 (21.0)	−7.2 (19.0)	−9.0 (15.8)	−7.6 (18.3)	−5.0 (23.0)	−2.2 (28.0)	−0.8 (30.6)	2.7 (36.9)	−9.0 (15.8)
Average rainfall mm (inches)	91.4 (3.60)	83.2 (3.28)	64.6 (2.54)	38.7 (1.52)	44.3 (1.74)	55.9 (2.20)	56.0 (2.20)	42.6 (1.68)	56.3 (2.22)	58.2 (2.29)	79.1 (3.11)	95.6 (3.76)	765.0 (30.12)
Average rainy days (≥ 0.2 mm)	8.3	6.7	6.7	4.2	5.8	8.2	8.5	6.8	7.0	7.7	9.2	8.6	87.7
Average afternoon relative humidity (%)	40	44	41	41	48	55	52	44	42	39	39	39	44
Source: Bureau of Meteorology

== Media ==
Independently owned and operated, the Coonabarabran Times newspaper circulates throughout the Warrumbungle Shire area. Approximately 2700 copies are distributed each Thursday across the townships of Coonabarabran, Binnaway, Baradine, Coolah, Dunedoo, Mendooran and Mullaley. The Coonabarabran Times was founded in 1927 as an amalgamation of The Bligh Watchman (1877–1927) and The Clarion (1910–1927). It continues to be a solid publication, consisting of local news and issues facing the community, sport, events and advertisements.

Coonabarabran registered Coonabarabran.com in 1999 and creating a website in 2001. Coonabarabran.org began in 2013 and it hosts Coonabarabran News, an online curation of local news and interest stories.

Coonabarabran also has a Facebook page and X account under the Coonabarabran name.

Coonabarabran can receive television from both Northern NSW and Southern NSW television markets via Mount Dowe (Northern NSW) and Mount Cenn Cruaich (Southern NSW).

The area is currently served by a small community radio station, 2WCR FM. This station broadcasts on 99.5 FM. It has a good broadcasting range but it can be a bit scratchy due to the hill-like terrain.

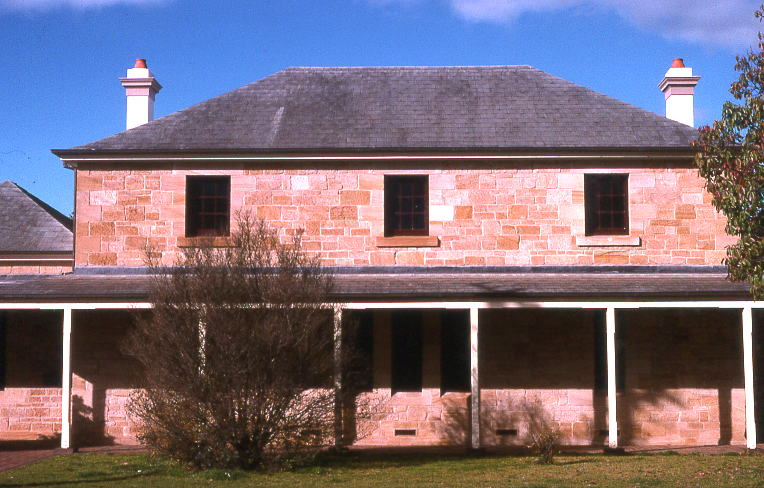
Old Coonabarabran Court House

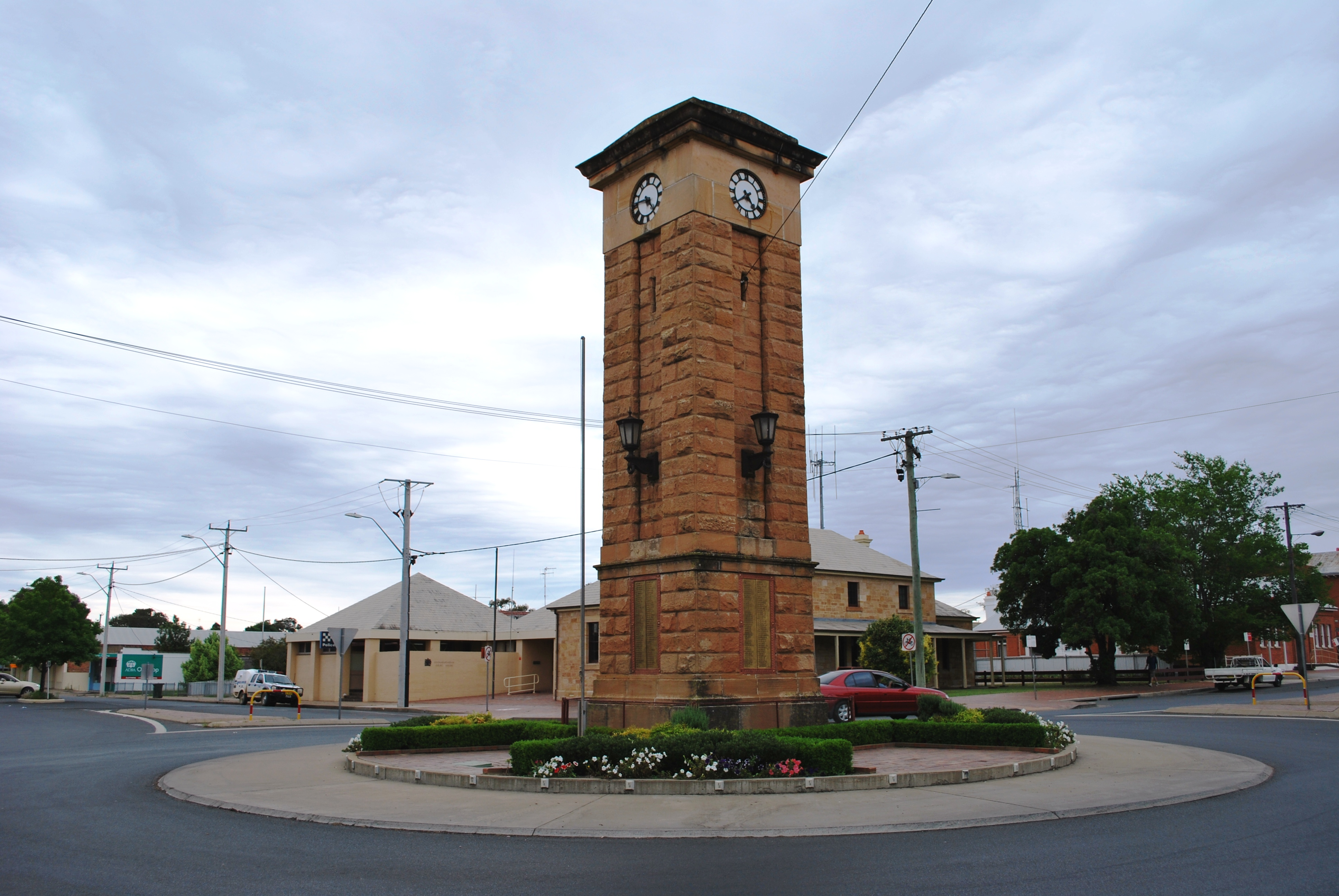
War memorial at Coonabarabran

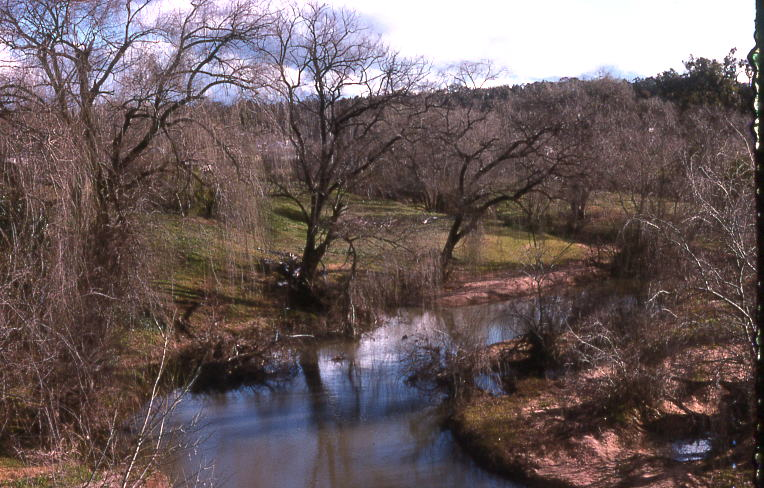
Castlereagh River

== Schools ==
In Coonabarabran are three schools:

=== Coonabarabran Public School ===
Coonabarabran Public School (established 1870) is on John Street, on the Oxley Highway and is Government funded. It has approximately 330 students from kindergarten to Year 6.

=== Coonabarabran High School ===
Coonabarabran High School (established 1962) is on the Oxley Highway and is Government funded providing secondary education to the surrounding area. It has approximately 380 students.

=== St Lawrence's Catholic Primary School ===
St Lawrence's Catholic Primary School is on Dalgarno Street, founded in 1888 by the Sisters of Saint Joseph. It caters for kindergarten to Year Six and has approximately 110 students. Education is based around the Catholic faith and is across the road from St Lawrence's Catholic Church. The high school part of the school closed at the end of 2009.

== Notable residents ==
- Ros Bower (1923–1980), was a TV producer and a leader in community arts. She was born here.
- Elizabeth Bryan, chair of Insurance Australia Group
- Mary Jane Cain, indigenous Australian who was instrumental in the 1912 establishment of the "Burra Bee Dee" Aboriginal Reserve
- Gerard Sutton, rugby league referee
- Kylea Tink, politician
- Kyle Turner, rugby league player 2014 premiership winner with South Sydney
- Will Robinson, rugby league player

== Transport ==
The township is on the Newell Highway and the Oxley Highway, approximately halfway between Melbourne and Brisbane and can be reached in about six hours by car from Sydney. It is on the main inland truck route between Queensland and Victoria.

The Gwabegar railway line passes through the town. Passenger rail services were replaced by coaches in the 1970s. The section of the Gwabegar line between Binnaway and Gwabegar is booked out of use, from 28 October 2005 for safety reasons.

Coonabarabran Airport is 12 km south of the town.

Preceding station	Former services	Following station
Yearinan towards Gwabegar	Gwabegar Line	Ulamambri towards Wallerawang
