= Mary Jane Cain =

Australian human rights activist

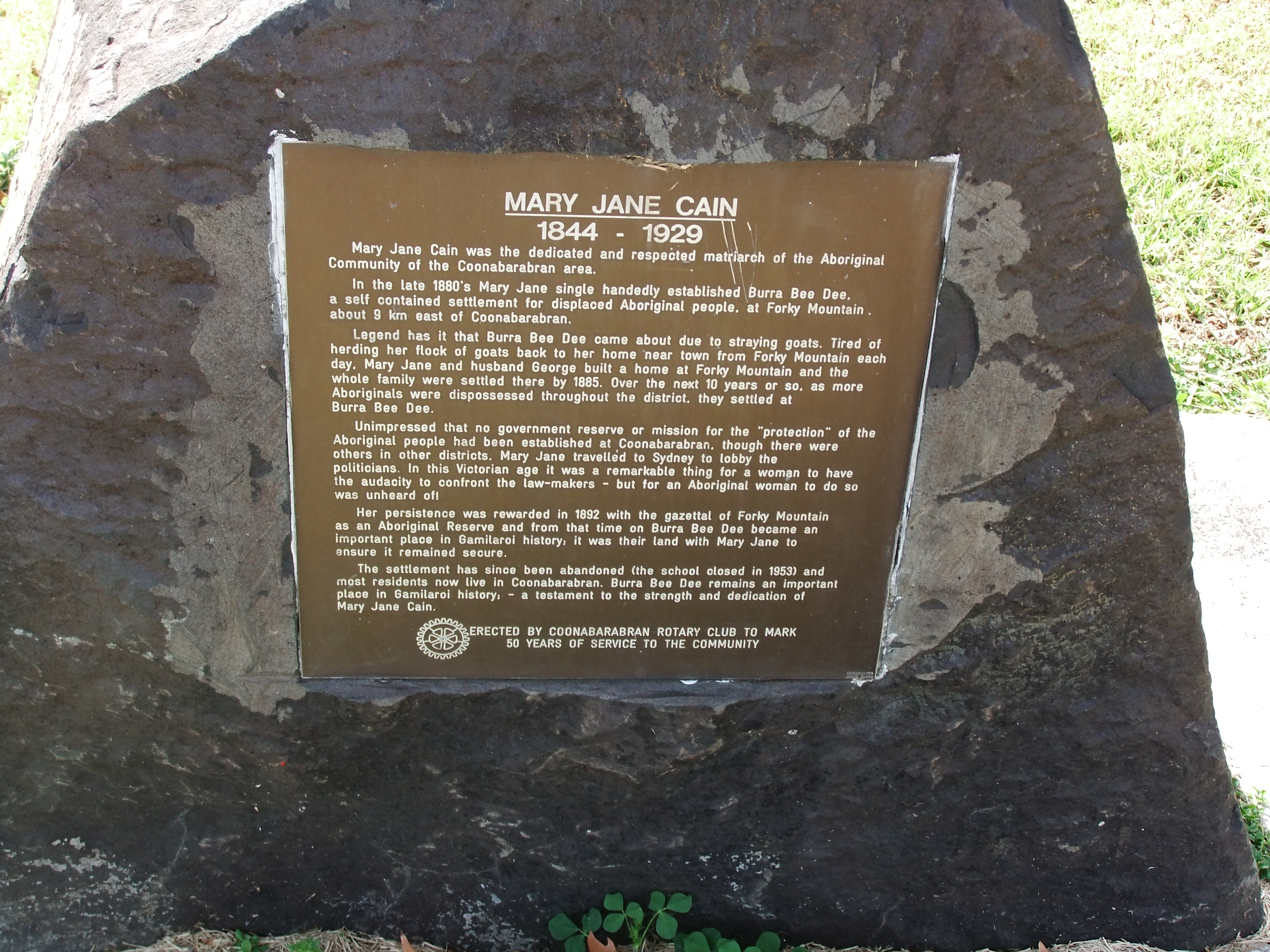
- Memorial plaque to Mary Jane Cain.
- Born: Mary Jane Griffin; February 18, 1844; Toorawandi Station, NSW
- Died: 29 July 1929 (aged 85); Burra Bee Dee, NSW
- Other name: Queenie Cain

Mary Jane Cain (1844–1929) was a community leader, a Gomeroi woman who lived in the Coonabarabran region of New South Wales. She was born in 1844 and was instrumental in the establishment of the Burra Bee Dee Aboriginal Reserve in 1912 and came to be known as the Queen of Burrabeedee or "Queenie Cain".

== Biography ==
Mary Jane was the daughter of Jinnie Griffin, an Aboriginal woman, and Irishman Eugene Griffin. She was born in 1844 on Toorawandi Station and christened at the age of 14 on horseback on the road between Coonabarabran and Mudgee. After her first marriage to James Budsworth, Mary Jane married head stockman George William Cain in 1865.

Much of what is known about the life of Mary Jane Cain was recorded in oral history interviews conducted by Margaret Somerville with four of her descendants—Marie Dundas, May Mead, Janet Robinson and Maureen Sulter. Somerville described Mary as "the woman who straddles two eras of history—the time before white settlement of this land and the time after. She moves between two worlds of such profound difference, and she gives her people the strength to move forward." She quotes Mary Jane, "We gotta make it good for ourselves to go forward, the people say. How can I move across this space between Nganyinytja and me?" After the death of her mother, Jinnie Griffin, in 1882, Mary became the leader of her community and was known to everyone as "Queenie" Cain.

In notices published after her death, Mary's recollections were recorded of the use of Chinese labour on farms in the area before the gold rush and how after the workers departed to prospect for gold, the squatters employed local Aboriginal workers as shepherds, effectively easing hostilities in the frontier wars.

Mary Jane Cain petitioned the government as her husband was unwell, and she needed to provide for their nine children. As a result Burra Bee Dee Aboriginal Reserve (no. 47521) was gazetted on 21 February 1912, it included a small parcel of land at Forky Mountain that had already been granted to Mary and her family by Queen Victoria.

Mary Jane Cain died at Burra Bee Dee, Coonabarabran, NSW on 29 July 1929 aged 85.

== Language ==
Mary Jane Cain spoke a local indigenous language, Gamilaraay, and a manuscript compiled by Mary is held at the State Library of New South Wales containing wordlists of place names and the natural environment.

== Memorials ==
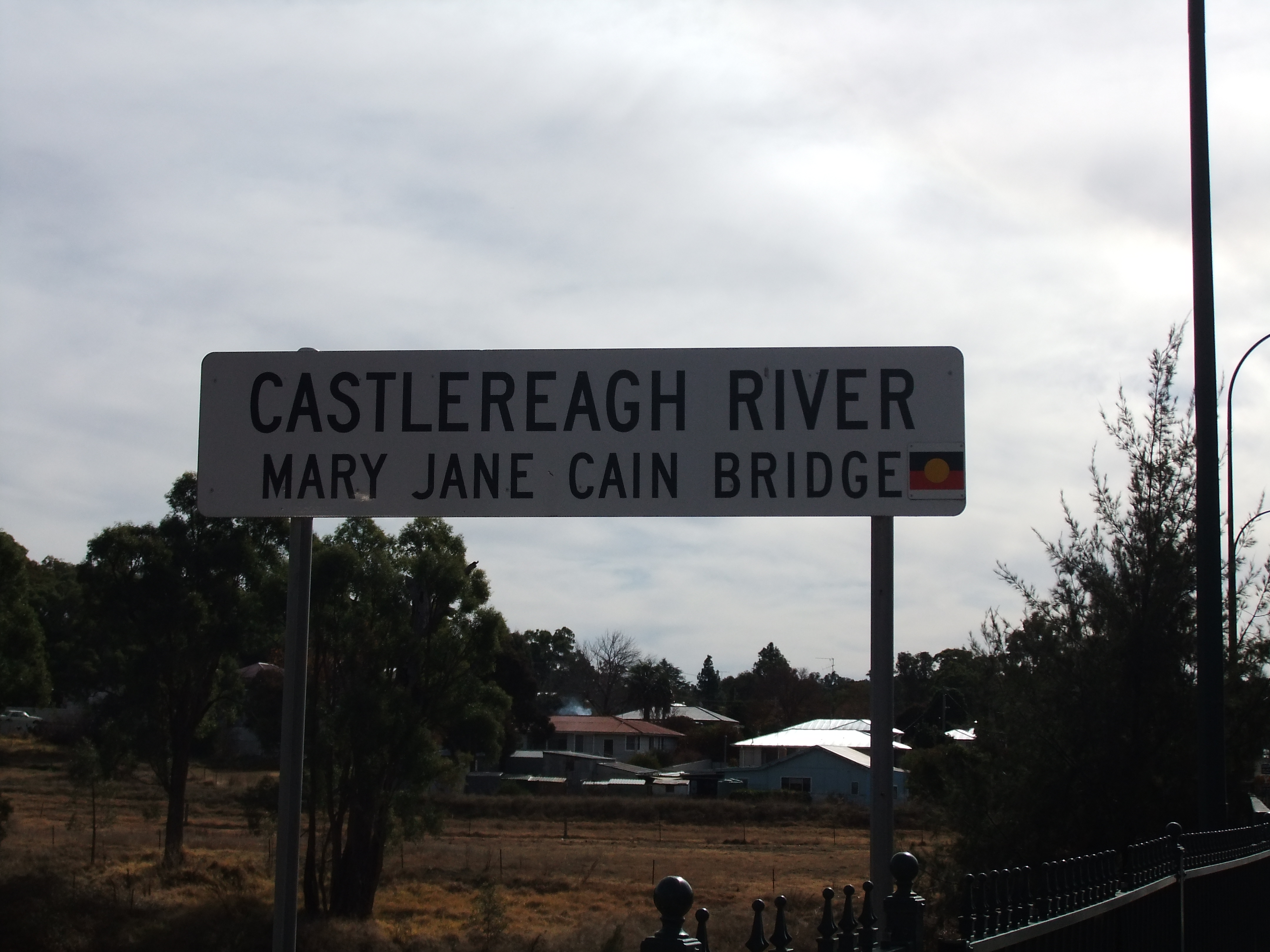
A sign marking the Mary Jane Cain Bridge in Coonabarabran, New South Wales

A bridge over the Castlereagh River in Coonabarabran was named after Mary Jane Cain. A plaque was erected by the Coonabarabran Rotary Club near the bridge in Coonabarabran to commemorate her 50 years of service to the community.
