= William Montgomery Davenport Davidson =

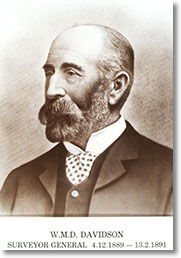
William Montgomery Davenport Davidson

William Montgomery Davenport Davidson J.P. (1830 – 1909 ), was a Surveyor-General of Queensland in Australia.

Davidson was born at Richmond, Surrey, in 1830. He was educated at the Moravian School in Yorkshire, and afterwards at the Stockwell Grammar School, which is connected with King's College, London. Mr. Davidson then went to the College of Civil Engineers, where he took his diploma.

Davidson left England for Tasmania in 1852, going over to Victoria the same year. He returned to Tasmania in 1854, and was appointed Inspecting Surveyor for the southern part of the island. In response to an invitation from Augustus Charles Gregory, who was then Surveyor-General, he went to Queensland in 1861, and was appointed Staff Surveyor. In 1868 he became District Surveyor, a position he held until June 1, 1875, when he accepted the post of Deputy-Surveyor-General. In December 1889, on the resignation of William Alcock Tully, Davidson exchanged this position for that of Surveyor-General.

Davidson had the "Cliveden" homestead built for him on a bend of the Brisbane River in Oxley, Queensland in 1889.
