= Edwin Cuthbert Hall =

Australian physician and botanist (1874–1953)

Dr Edwin Cuthbert Hall
- Born: 1874; Ashfield, New South Wales
- Died: 9 April 1953 (aged 78–79); Vaucluse, New South Wales
- Education: Newington College; University of Sydney
- Occupation: Physician
- Title: Dr E. C. Hall
- Spouse(s): 1 Mary Hall (died 1937); 2 Amelia Hall (died 1958)

Edwin Cuthbert Hall (1874–1953) was an Australian physician and philanthropist who through a bequest funded the Edwin Cuthbert Hall Chair of Middle Eastern Archaeology within the Department of Archaeology at the University of Sydney. In 1973, the Hall Bequest was the second largest donation to the university after the Power Bequest.

== Birth and education ==
Hall was born in Sydney to Reuben and Mary Ann Hall of Ashfield, New South Wales, and attended Newington College (1886–1891). In 1889 and again in 1890, he won the Wigram Allen Scholarship, awarded by Sir George Wigram Allen, for mathematics, with David Edwards receiving it in 1890 for classics. At the end of 1891 Hall was named Dux of the college and received the Schofield Scholarship. He went up to the University of Sydney and in 1894 graduated as a Bachelor of Medicine and Chirurgery.

== Marriages ==
Hall married Mary Blair Ewan a daughter of James Ewan of Glenleigh, Penrith. She was a niece of the late Sir George Reid. Mary Hall died in 1932. He married, secondly, Amella Wilmot Scanlan, youngest daughter of the late Augustus Scanlan of Mayfair, Potts Point, in 1932. Hall was survived by his second wife on his death in 1953.

== Medical career ==
After appointments as a resident medical officer and a medical superintendent at Royal Prince Alfred Hospital, Hall became the Government Medical Officer at Parramatta, New South Wales in 1922. After the death of his first wife, Hall became a specialist with rooms in Macquarie Street, Sydney.

== Botany ==
Hall was the author of several plant species, especially in the genus Eucalyptus.

== Death and bequest ==
The terms of Hall's will were that his estate was to be held in trust until the death of his wife "for the University of Sydney for the endowment of a Professorship in the subjects of Archaeology and Mythology in the Ancient Middle East, namely, Palestine, Egypt and Asia Minor." On 31 December 1959 the university received £88,608 12s. 7d. In 1960 the Edwin Cuthbert Hall Chair of Middle Eastern Archaeology was established with the first occupant being appointed on 2 August 1960.

Awards
Preceded by David Edwards	Schofield Scholarship; Dux of Newington College; 1891	Succeeded by Ernest Warren
