= Red gum (Australia) =

Red gum applies to any of several Australian trees including:

- Angophora costata, Sydney red gum
- Corymbia calophylla, red gum or marri, native to Western Australia
- Corymbia ficifolia, red-flowering gum
- Eucalyptus ammophila, sandplain red gum
- Eucalyptus bancroftii, Bancroft's red gum
- Eucalyptus blakelyi, Blakely's red gum, forest red gum, white budded red gum or hill red gum
- Eucalyptus brassiana, Cape York red gum
- Eucalyptus camaldulensis, river red gum
- Eucalyptus chloroclada, Baradine red gum
- Eucalyptus dealbata, hill red gum, tumble-down red gum
- Eucalyptus dwyeri, Dwyer's red gum
- Eucalyptus glaucina, slaty red gum
- Eucalyptus lane-poolei, red-freckled gum
- Eucalyptus macrorhyncha, red gum, red stringybark, Cannon's stringybark or Capertee stringybark
- Eucalyptus mannifera, red spotted gum
- Eucalyptus nandewarica, Eucalyptus flindersii, Eucalyptus gillenii, mallee red gum
- Eucalyptus parramattensis, Parramatta red gum
- Eucalyptus seeana, narrow-leaved red gum
- Eucalyptus tereticornis, red gum, forest red gum or red irongum
- Eucalyptus vicina, Manara Hills red gum
