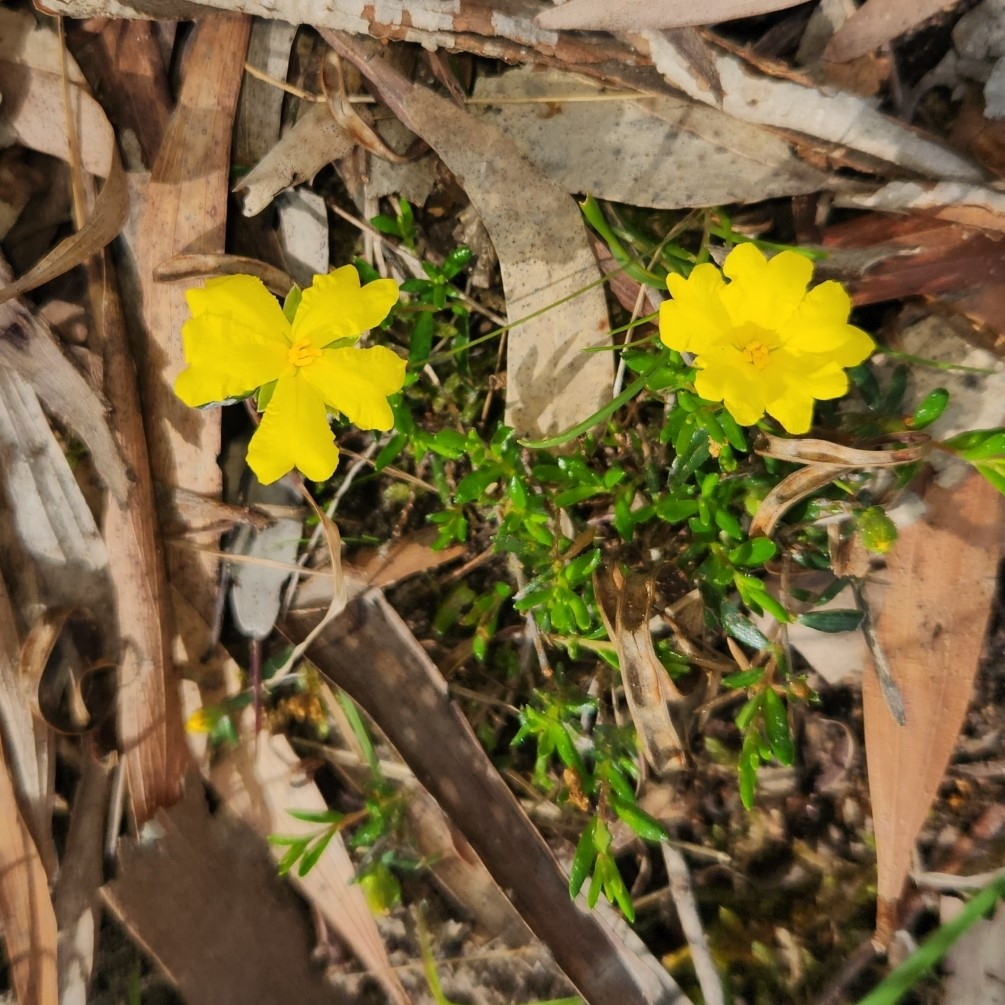

Scientific classification
- Kingdom: Plantae
- Clade: Tracheophytes
- Clade: Angiosperms
- Clade: Eudicots
- Order: Dilleniales
- Family: Dilleniaceae
- Genus: Hibbertia
- Species: H. sessiliflora

Binomial name
- Hibbertia sessiliflora Toelken

= Hibbertia sessiliflora =

Species of flowering plant

Hibbertia sessiliflora is a species of flowering plant in the family Dilleniaceae and is endemic to south-eastern continental Australia. It is a small, sparsely hairy shrub with thin, low-lying branches, elliptic to lance-shaped leaves and yellow flowers with four to six stamens in a single cluster on one side of two hairy carpels.

== Description ==
Hibbertia sessiliflora is sparsely hairy shrublet that typically grows to a height of up to 20 cm (7.9 in) and has wiry, spreading to low-lying branches. The leaves are elliptic to lance-shaped, 3.6–9.6 mm (0.14–0.38 in) long, 1.2–3.2 mm (0.047–0.126 in) wide on a petiole 0.3–0.6 mm (0.012–0.024 in) long, and with the edges rolled downwards. The flowers are arranged singly on the ends of short side shoots and are sessile with three or four densely hairy triangular bracts 1.2–1.5 mm (0.047–0.059 in) long at the base. The five sepal are 5.4–6.3 mm (0.21–0.25 in) long and joined at the base, the outer lobes slightly longer but narrower than the inner ones. The petals are yellow, egg-shaped with the narrower end towards the base, 3.8–9.6 mm (0.15–0.38 in) long with four to six stamens in a single cluster on one side of the two hairy carpels, each carpel with four ovules. Flowering mostly occurs from September to November.

== Taxonomy ==
Hibbertia sessiliflora was first formally described in 1995 by Hellmut R. Toelken in the Journal of the Adelaide Botanic Gardens from specimens he collected near Dergholm.

== Distribution and habitat ==
This hibbertia grows in heath and woodland in a restricted area near the border between South Australia and Victoria.

== See also ==
- List of Hibbertia species
