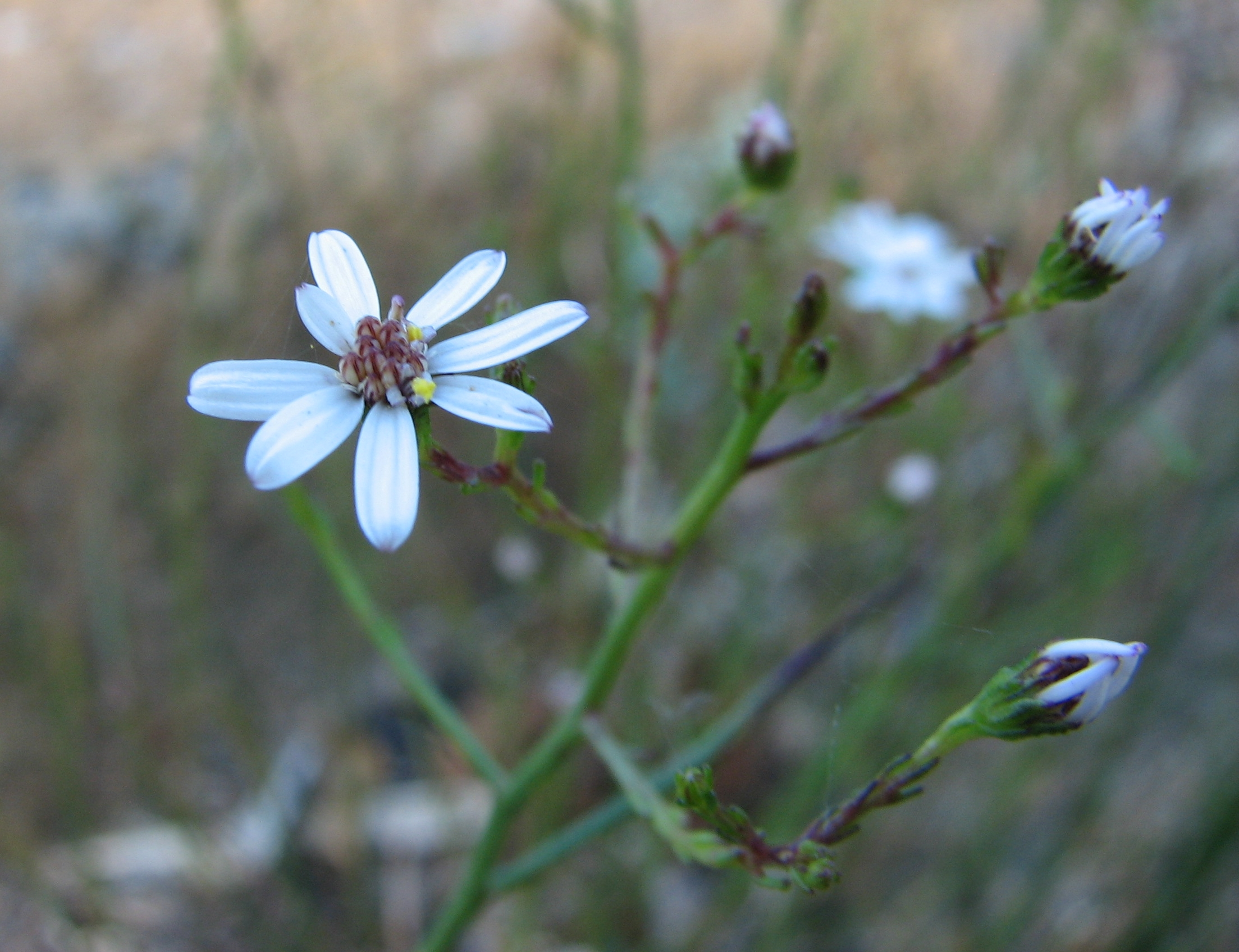
- In the Royal Botanic Gardens Melbourne

Scientific classification
- Kingdom: Plantae
- Clade: Tracheophytes
- Clade: Angiosperms
- Clade: Eudicots
- Clade: Asterids
- Order: Asterales
- Family: Asteraceae
- Genus: Spongotrichum
- Species: S. suffruticosum

Binomial name
- Spongotrichum suffruticosum (D.A.Cooke) G.L.Nesom

Synonyms
- Eoglandula suffruticosa (D.A.Cooke) G.L.Nesom; Olearia suffruticosa D.A.Cooke

= Spongotrichum suffruticosum =

Species of plant

Spongotrichum suffruticosum, commonly known as clustered daisy-bush, is a species of flowering plant in the family Asteraceae and is endemic to south-eastern continental Australia. It is a shrub or undershrub with scattered, linear, grass-like leaves and pink to white and yellow and pink, daisy-like inflorescences.

== Description ==
Spongotrichum suffruticosum is a sticky shrub or undershrub that typically grows to a height of 40–70 cm (16–28 in) and has a woody base and slender, short-lived glabrous stems with few branches. The leaves are arranged alternately, sessile, linear and grass-like, 3–24 mm (0.12–0.94 in) long and 0.5–0.9 mm (0.020–0.035 in) wide and more or less glabrous. The heads or daisy-like "flowers" are arranged in leafy panicles on the ends of branches, on a peduncle up to 50 mm (2.0 in) long, each head with a bell-shaped involucre at the base. Each head has 12 to 20 white to pink ray florets, the ligule 7–8 mm (0.28–0.31 in) long, surrounding 16 to 22 yellow and pink disc florets. Flowering occurs from January to May and the fruit is an achene about 1 mm (0.039 in) long, the pappus about 2 mm (0.079 in) long.

== Taxonomy ==
The species was first formally described as Olearia suffruticosa by David Alan Cooke in 1985 in the Journal of the Adelaide Botanic Gardens from specimens collected near the Bool Lagoon in 1963. The specific epithet (suffruticosa) means "somewhat woody". In 2020 Guy L. Nesom placed the species in the newly-described genus Spongotrichum as S. suffruticosum after Olearia had been found to be polyphyletic.

== Distribution and habitat ==
Clustered daisy-bush grows in heathland in swampy areas in the far south-east of South Australia, the south-west of Victoria near Glenisla, Casterton and Dergholm, and between Capertee and Wallerawang in New South Wales.

== Conservation status ==
This species is listed as "endangered" under the Victoria Government Flora and Fauna Guarantee Act 1988 and as "vulnerable" in the Department of Sustainability and Environment's Advisory List of Rare Or Threatened Plants In Victoria.
