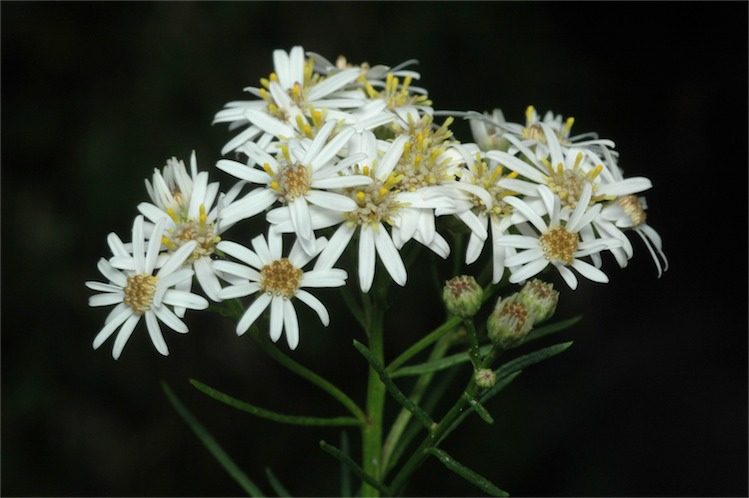
- Spongotrichum glandulosum in Tallaganda National Park

Scientific classification
- Kingdom: Plantae
- Clade: Tracheophytes
- Clade: Angiosperms
- Clade: Eudicots
- Clade: Asterids
- Order: Asterales
- Family: Asteraceae
- Genus: Spongotrichum
- Species: S. glandulosum

Binomial name
- Spongotrichum glandulosum (Labill.)

Synonyms
- Aster glandulosus Labill.; Aster rutaeodorus A.Cunn. ex DC.; Eoglandula glandulosa (Labill.) G.L.Nesom; Eurybia glandulosa (Labill.) DC.; Galatella glandulosa (Labill.) Nees; Olearia glandulosa (Labill.) Benth.; Shawia glandulosa (Labill.) Sch.Bip.

= Spongotrichum glandulosum =

Swamp daisy-bush

Species of plant

Spongotrichum glandulosum, commonly known as swamp daisy-bush, is a species of flowering plant in the family Asteraceae and is endemic to south-eastern Australia. It is a slender, erect, glabrous shrub with sticky, narrowly linear leaves and white or pale blue and yellow, daisy-like inflorescences.

== Description ==
Spongotrichum glandulosum is a slender, erect, glabrous shrub that typically grows to a height of 1.5–2.4 m (4 ft 11 in – 7 ft 10 in) with many branches. Its leaves are arranged alternately along the branchlets, more or less sessile, narrowly linear, 8–55 mm (0.31–2.17 in) long, 1–2 mm (0.039–0.079 in) wide and sticky, with several glandular swellings on the edges. The heads or daisy-like "flowers" are arranged in corymbs on the ends of branches, and are 6–12 mm (0.24–0.47 in) in diameter on a peduncle mostly about 1 mm (0.039 in) long with three or four rows of bracts at the base. Each head has 15 to 25 white or pale blue ray florets, the ligules 4–9 mm (0.16–0.35 in) long, surrounding a similar number of yellow disc florets. Flowering mostly occurs from October to April and the fruit is a silky-hairy achene, the pappus 3–4 mm (0.12–0.16 in) long.

== Taxonomy ==
Swamp daisy-bush was first formally described in 1806 by Jacques Labillardière who gave it the name Aster glandulosus in his Novae Hollandiae Plantarum Specimen. The specific epithet (glandulosa) means "gland-bearing". In 1867, George Bentham changed the name to Olearia glandulosa in the Flora Australiensis. In 2020 Guy L. Nesom placed the species in the newly-described genus Spongotrichum as S. glandulosum after Olearia had been found to be polyphyletic.

== Distribution and habitat ==
Spongotrichum glandulosum grows in wet heath, swamps and along river banks in far south-eastern Queensland, south of Mittagong in south-eastern New South Wales and the Australian Capital Territory, mostly south of the Great Dividing Range in Victoria, in the far south-east of South Australia, and in Tasmania.
