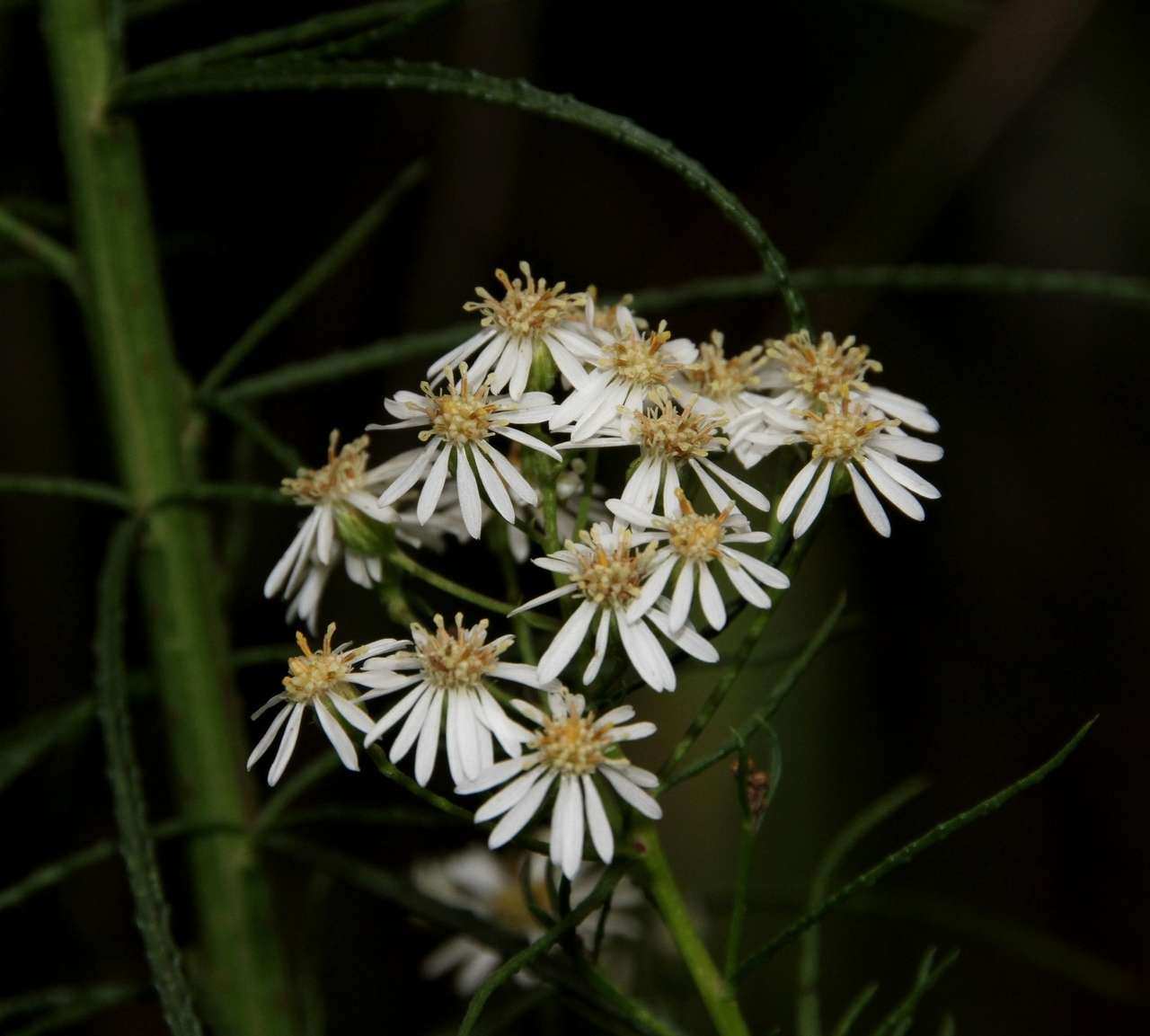
- Spongotrichum glandulosum

Scientific classification
- Kingdom: Plantae
- Clade: Tracheophytes
- Clade: Angiosperms
- Clade: Eudicots
- Clade: Asterids
- Order: Asterales
- Family: Asteraceae
- Subfamily: Asteroideae
- Tribe: Astereae
- Subtribe: Brachyscominae
- Genus: Spongotrichum (DC.) Nees ex Spach (1841)

Species
- Spongotrichum glandulosum (Labill.) G.L.Nesom; Spongotrichum suffruticosum (D.A.Cooke) G.L.Nesom

Synonyms
- Eoglandula G.L.Nesom; Eurybia sect. Spongotrichum DC. (1836)

= Spongotrichum =

Genus of flowering plants

Spongotrichum is a genus of flowering plants in the family Asteraceae. It includes two species native to southeastern Australia (New South Wales, South Australia, Tasmania, and Victoria).

- Spongotrichum glandulosum (Labill.) G.L.Nesom
- Spongotrichum suffruticosum (D.A.Cooke) G.L.Nesom
