= Eucalyptus vicina =

Manara Hills red gum

Scientific classification
- Kingdom: Plantae
- Clade: Tracheophytes
- Clade: Angiosperms
- Clade: Eudicots
- Clade: Rosids
- Order: Myrtales
- Family: Myrtaceae
- Genus: Eucalyptus
- Species: E. vicina

Binomial name
- Eucalyptus vicina L.A.S.Johnson & K.D.Hill

Species of eucalyptus

Eucalyptus vicina, commonly known as the Manara Hills red gum, is a species of mallee in the family Myrtaceae and is endemic to western New South Wales. It has smooth bark, lance-shaped to curved adult leaves, flower buds in groups of seven, white flowers and cup-shaped or hemispherical fruit.

== Description ==
Eucalyptus vicina is a tree or a mallee that typically grows to a height of 8 m (26 ft) and forms a lignotuber. It has smooth mottled grey, brown and pinkish bark. Young plants and coppice regrowth have stems that are square in cross-section and usually glaucous, and leaves that are egg-shaped 50–90 mm (2.0–3.5 in) long and 25–49 mm (0.98–1.93 in) wide. Adult leaves are the same shade of green on both sides, lance-shaped to curved, 55–160 mm (2.2–6.3 in) long and 7–27 mm (0.28–1.06 in) wide tapering to a petiole 10–35 mm (0.39–1.38 in) long. The flower buds are arranged in leaf axils in groups of seven on an unbranched peduncle 3–8 mm (0.12–0.31 in) long, the individual buds sessile or on pedicels up to 2 mm (0.079 in) long. Mature buds are oval to diamond-shaped, 6–10 mm (0.24–0.39 in) long and 3–6 mm (0.12–0.24 in) wide with a conical to rounded operculum that is slightly longer than the floral cup. Flowering has been observed in June, September and October and the flowers are white. The fruit is a woody cup-shaped or hemispherical capsule 4–6 mm (0.16–0.24 in) long and 4–8 mm (0.16–0.31 in) wide with the valves protruding.

== Taxonomy and naming ==
Eucalyptus vicina was first formally described in 1991 by Lawrie Johnson and Ken Hill in the journal Telopea from Manara Hill in western New South Wales. The specific epithet (vicina) is from the Latin vicinus meaning "neighbouring" or "closely resembling", referring to the similarity of this species to other small red gums, including E. dwyeri.

== Distribution and habitat ==
Manara Hills red gum grows in mallee shrubland on stony hills from Griffith, New South Wales and Mutawintji National Park to north of Bourke.
