= Eucalyptus brassiana =

Conservation status
- Least Concern (IUCN 3.1)

Scientific classification
- Kingdom: Plantae
- Clade: Tracheophytes
- Clade: Angiosperms
- Clade: Eudicots
- Clade: Rosids
- Order: Myrtales
- Family: Myrtaceae
- Genus: Eucalyptus
- Species: E. brassiana

Binomial name
- Eucalyptus brassiana S.T.Blake

Species of eucalyptus

Eucalyptus brassiana, commonly known as Cape York gum, gum-topped peppermint or as karo in PNG is a small to medium-sized tree that is native to northern Queensland and PNG. It has rough, hard, fissured bark on the trunk and smooth greyish bark on the branches, narrow lance-shaped adult leaves, flower buds in groups of seven, white flowers and hemispherical or cup-shaped fruit.

== Description ==
Eucalyptus brassiana is a tree that typically grows to a height of about 20 m (70 ft) and forms a lignotuber. The bark on the lower part of the trunk but sometimes extending to the branches is rough, hard and dark grey to black. The bark above is smooth grey over white to creamy yellow. The leaves on young plants are arranged in opposite pairs, egg-shaped to broadly lance-shaped, 60–215 mm (2–8 in) long, 35–70 mm (1–3 in) wide and dull green. The adult leaves are narrow lance-shaped, often curved, 100–220 mm (3.9–8.7 in) long and 10–25 mm (0.4–1 in) wide on a petiole 12–22 mm (0.47–0.87 in) long. They are the same colour glossy green on both surfaces. The flower buds are arranged in groups of seven on a peduncle 10–22 mm (0.4–0.9 in) long, the individual buds on a pedicel 6–9 mm (0.2–0.4 in) long. The mature buds are creamy yellow, oval, 10–15 mm (0.4–0.6 in) long and 4–7 mm (0.2–0.3 in) wide with a conical to horn-shaped operculum 8–10 mm (0.3–0.4 in) long. The flowers are white and the fruit is a woody, hemispherical to cup-shaped capsule 4–10 mm (0.2–0.4 in) long and 7–12 mm (0.3–0.5 in) wide with the four or five valves extending beyond the rim of the fruit.

== Taxonomy and naming ==
Eucalyptus brassiana was first formally described in 1977 by Stanley Thatcher Blake from a specimen he collected at Cooktown in 1958. The description was published in the journal Austrobaileya. The specific epithet (brassiana) honours Leonard John Brass, who collected plant specimens on Cape York Peninsula.

== Distribution and habitat ==
Cape York red gum grows in woodland and open forest on seasonally flooded flats, on rocky slopes and undulating plains. It occurs on the north-eastern side of the Cape York Peninsula and as far south as Helenvale. It is also found in south-western Papua New Guinea.

== See also ==
- List of Eucalyptus species
