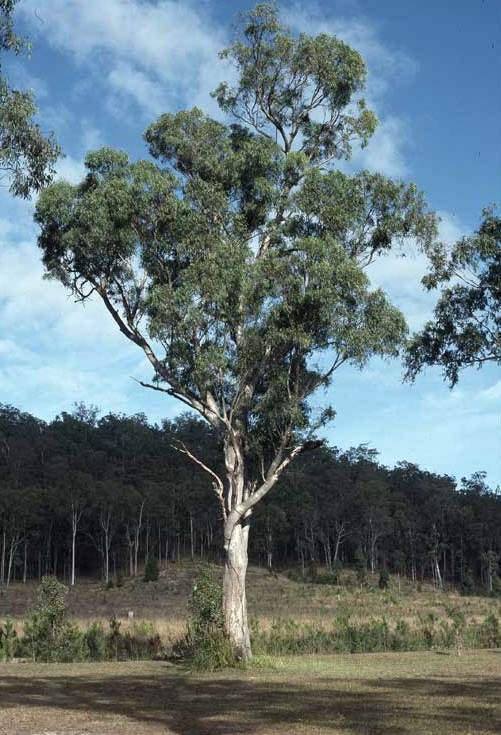

Conservation status
- Near Threatened (IUCN 3.1)

Scientific classification
- Kingdom: Plantae
- Clade: Tracheophytes
- Clade: Angiosperms
- Clade: Eudicots
- Clade: Rosids
- Order: Myrtales
- Family: Myrtaceae
- Genus: Eucalyptus
- Species: E. seeana

Binomial name
- Eucalyptus seeana Maiden

Synonyms
- Eucalyptus seeana Maiden subsp. seeana nom. inval.; Eucalyptus seeana Maiden var. seeana; Eucalyptus tereticornis var. linearis R.T.Baker & H.G.Sm.

= Eucalyptus seeana =

Narrow-leaved red gum

Species of eucalyptus

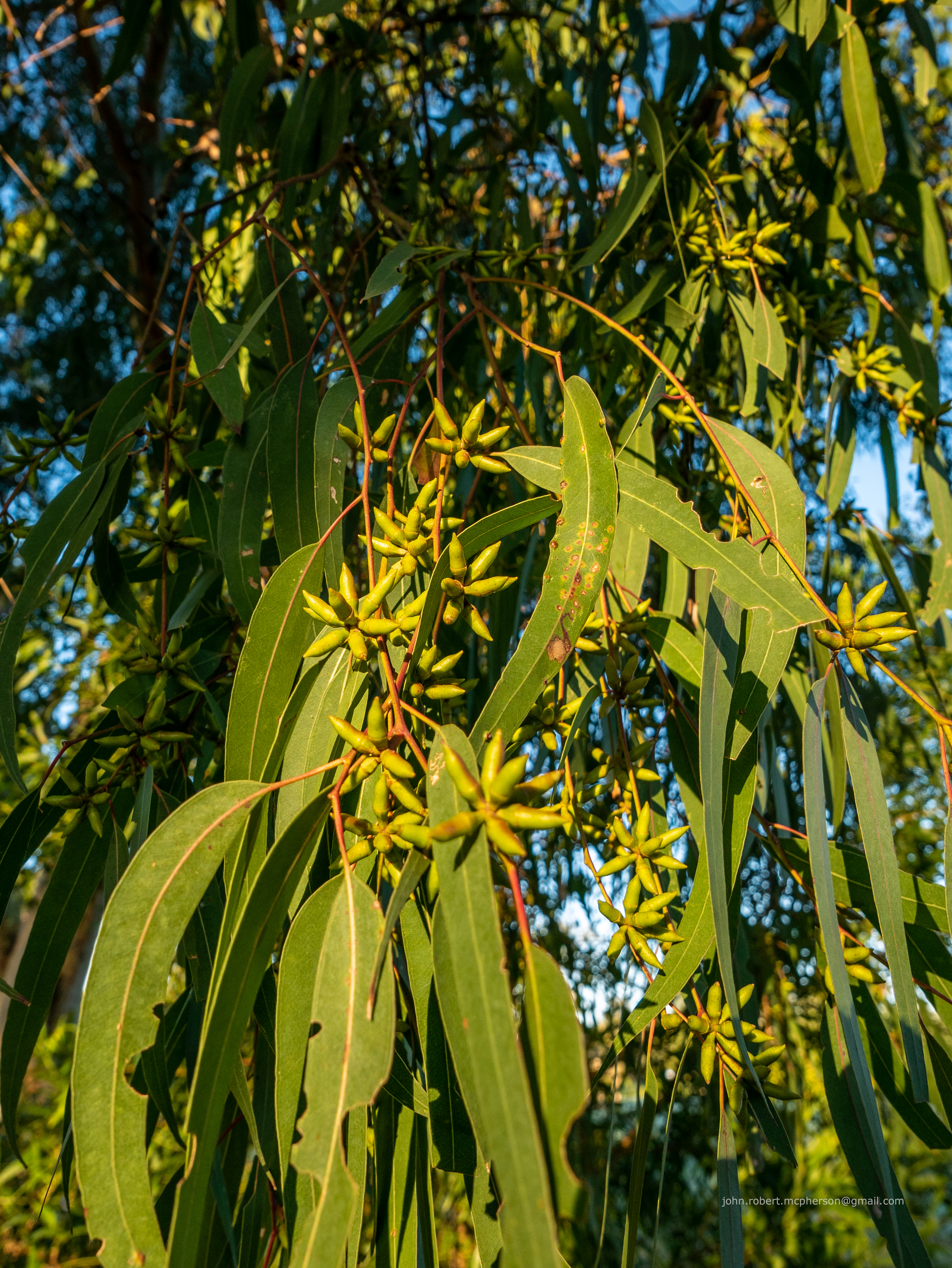
Flower buds

Eucalyptus seeana, or narrow-leaved red gum, is a species of small to medium-sized tree that is endemic to eastern Australia. It has smooth bark, lance-shaped adult leaves, flower buds in groups of between seven and eleven, white flowers and hemispherical fruit.

== Description ==
Eucalyptus seeana is a tree that typically grows to a height of 40 m (130 ft) and forms a lignotuber. Young plants and coppice regrowth have dull, greyish green leaves that are linear to lance-shaped, 50–120 mm (2.0–4.7 in) long and 8–20 mm (0.31–0.79 in) wide and petiolate. Adult leaves are arranged alternately, the same shade of green on both sides, narrow lance-shaped to lance-shaped, 100–180 mm (3.9–7.1 in) long and 10–25 mm (0.39–0.98 in) wide, tapering to a petiole 10–22 mm (0.39–0.87 in) long. The flower buds are arranged in leaf axils in groups of seven, nine or eleven on an unbranched peduncle 5–13 mm (0.20–0.51 in) long, the individual buds on pedicels 2–6 mm (0.079–0.236 in) long. Mature buds are oblong to spindle-shaped, 10–16 mm (0.39–0.63 in) long and 3–5 mm (0.12–0.20 in) wide with a horn-shaped operculum 7–12 mm (0.28–0.47 in) long. Flowering has been observed in November and December and the flowers are white. The fruit is a woody, hemispherical capsule 2–5 mm (0.079–0.197 in) long and 5–8 mm (0.20–0.31 in) wide with the valves protruding strongly.

== Taxonomy and naming ==
Eucalyptus seeana was first formally described in 1904 by Joseph Maiden in the Proceedings of the Linnean Society of New South Wales. The specific epithet honours John See.

== Distribution and habitat ==
The narrow-leaved red gum mostly grows as scattered individuals in forest and occurs from near Caloundra in Queensland to near Telegraph Point in New South Wales.

== Conservation status ==
The population of this species in the Taree LGA is listed as an "endangered population" and is threatened by habitat fragmentation, weed invasion and forestry activities. In Queensland it is classified as "least concern" under the Nature Conservation Act 1992. The IUCN Red List assesses the species as Near Threatened.
