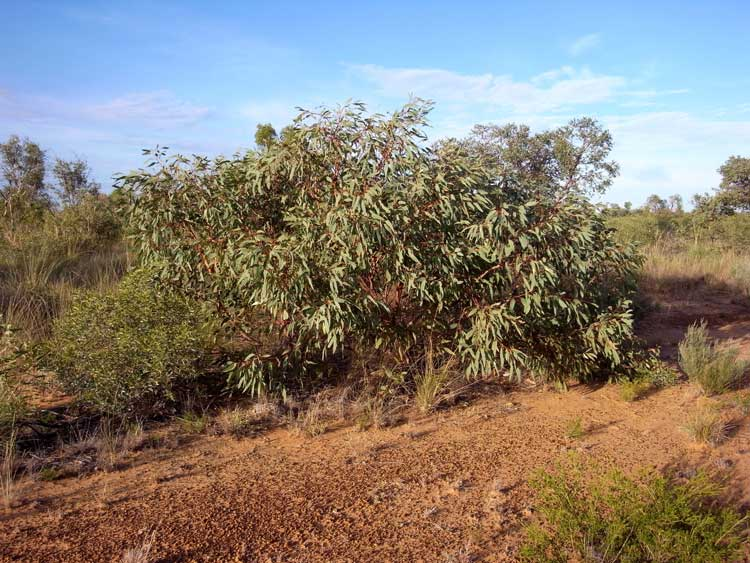
- Eucalyptus ammophila growing near Aramac

Conservation status
- Least Concern (IUCN 3.1)

Scientific classification
- Kingdom: Plantae
- Clade: Tracheophytes
- Clade: Angiosperms
- Clade: Eudicots
- Clade: Rosids
- Order: Myrtales
- Family: Myrtaceae
- Genus: Eucalyptus
- Species: E. ammophila

Binomial name
- Eucalyptus ammophila Brooker & Slee

= Eucalyptus ammophila =

Sandplain red gum

Species of eucalyptus

Eucalyptus ammophila, commonly known as the sandplain red gum, is a mallee that is endemic to central and southern Queensland. It has rough fibrous bark near the base and smooth greyish and orange to bronze bark higher up. It has lance-shaped leaves, yellow or creamy flower buds in groups of between seven and eleven, white flowers and hemispherical fruit with strongly raised valves.

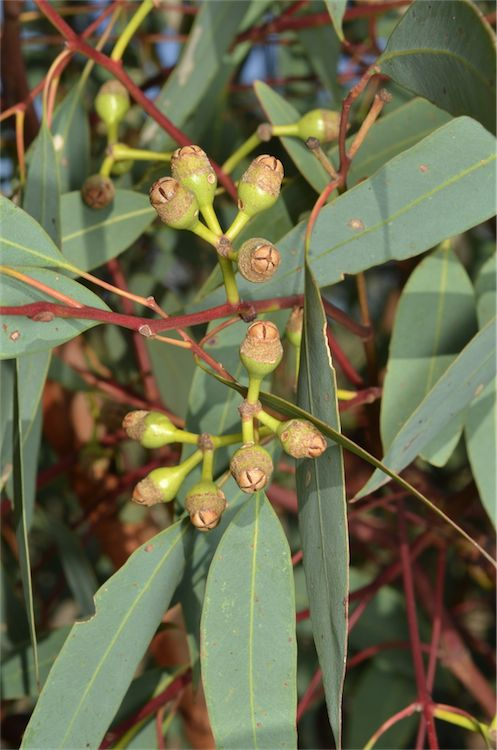
foliage and fruit

== Description ==
Eucalyptus ammophila is a mallee that grows to 6 m (20 ft) high, rarely a small, multistemmed tree, and forms a lignotuber. The trunk has rough, fibrous, greyish brown bark and the upper parts of the trunk and the branches have smooth greyish and orange to bronze-coloured bark. Young plants and coppice regrowth have square stems and broad lance-shaped to egg-shaped leaves that are 60–85 mm (2.4–3.3 in) long and 22–36 mm (0.87–1.4 in) wide with a short petiole. Adult leaves are lance-shaped, 65–135 mm (2.6–5.3 in) long and 15–25 mm (0.59–0.98 in) wide with a petiole 7–25 mm (0.28–0.98 in) long. Both sides of the leaf are the same dull green, although bluish green at first.

The flowers are arranged in groups of between seven and eleven in leaf axils on a peduncle 5–12 mm (0.2–0.5 in) long, each flower on a pedicel about 2 mm (0.08 in) long. The mature flower buds are oval to spindle-shaped, yellow or cream-coloured, 8–9 mm (0.3–0.4 in) long and about 5 mm (0.2 in) wide. The operculum is cone-shaped and about 6 mm (0.2 in) long. The fruit is a hemispherical capsule 3–5 mm (0.12–0.20 in) long and 6–9 mm (0.24–0.35 in) wide with the four, sometimes five, strongly raised valves.

== Taxonomy and naming ==
Eucalyptus ammophila was first formally described in 1994 by Ian Brooker and Andrew Slee from a specimen collected in the Maranoa region of Queensland, and the description was published in the journal Austrobaileya. According to Brooker and Slee, the specific epithet (ammophila) is derived from the Greek ammos, "sand" and phila "loving" referring to this species' preference for growing on sandplains. In ancient Greek, "loving" is however philos (φίλος) (masculine) or philē (φίλη) (feminine).

== Distribution and habitat ==
The sandplain red gum grows on red or orange sandplains in central and southern Queensland, including areas near Charleville, Yalleroi Jericho and the White Mountains.

== See also ==
- List of Eucalyptus species
