= Dergholm State Park =

- IUCN category II (national park)
- Location within Victoria
- Location: Victoria
- Nearest city: Casterton
- Coordinates: 37°22′14″S 141°17′38″E
- Area: 104 km^{2} (40 sq mi)
- Established: 1982
- Governing body: Parks Victoria
- Website: Official website

The Dergholm State Park is located in the far west of Victoria, Australia. It is 390 km west of Melbourne and 450 km east of Adelaide, South Australia.

== Introduction ==
The park has an area of 104 square kilometres and has a relatively dry range of habitat, common throughout the hill country of western Victoria, Australia of woodlands, open forests, heaths and dry swamps, and is traversed by the Glenelg River. Biota include varied birds, reptiles, mammals, banksias, wattles, eucalyptus trees and other life forms. It was proclaimed a park in 1982.

== Fauna ==
The sugar glider is a nocturnal possum that can glide from tree to tree using a membrane between its front and rear limbs. Other animals include echidnas, koalas, eastern grey kangaroos and various reptiles such as marbled gecko, eastern blue-tongued lizard and tiger snake. Birds include the red-tailed black cockatoo, swift parrot and powerful owl.

== Flora ==
These include pink gum, yellow gum, brown stringybark, red gum, swamp riparian, clay heath, vegetation communities.

== History ==
Aboriginal Kana gundidj clan inhabited the area until European arrival in 1830. The native population was quickly displaced by European farmers, but the area of the park saw little farming activity.

== See also ==
- Protected areas of Victoria
