= Stringybark =

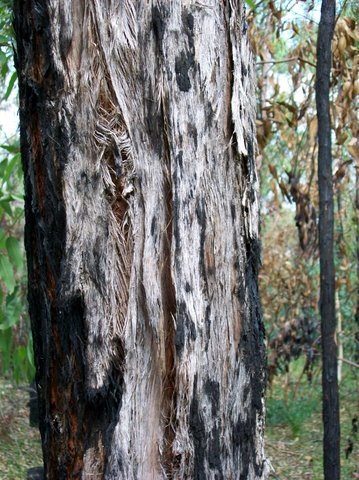
Stringybark of Eucalyptus globoidea

A stringybark is any of various Eucalyptus species which have thick, fibrous bark. Like all eucalypts, stringybarks belong to the family Myrtaceae.

== Name origin ==
Although eucalypts (gum tree) specimens had been collected earlier, the names "stringybark" and "eucalyptus" derive from a specimen collected on James Cook's third expedition to Bruny Island, off the coast of Tasmania. The specimen was sent to the British Museum in London, where it was named Eucalyptus obliqua by French botanist Charles Louis L'Héritier de Brutelle in 1788. This species, also known as "messmate stringybark", is the type specimen for all Eucalyptus species. That species of eucalypt has fibrous stringy bark covering its trunk, leading to the name "stringybark". The origins of the name "messmate" is unknown, and it is also used for several other species of eucalypt.

== Description ==
"Stringybark" is a descriptive, vernacular name for many Eucalyptus species which have thick, fibrous bark.

In exceptionally fertile locations, some stringybark species, such as messmate stringybark (Eucalyptus obliqua), can be very large, reaching over 90 m (300 ft) in height. More typically, stringybarks are medium-sized trees in the 10–40 m (33–131 ft) range. The term stringybark is a descriptive, vernacular name and does not imply any special taxonomic relationship within the genus Eucalyptus. For example, scientists consider Eucalyptus obliqua to not be closely related to the other stringybarks, because of the gumnut shape. Also, Eucalyptus acmenoides is part of the "mahogany" group of eucalyptus, as the gumnuts are a different shape, despite the bark being somewhat stringy.

== Uses ==
For thousands of years, Aboriginal Australians have used various types of stringybark trees for a variety of uses, including for their healing properties.

The Worimi people of the coastal areas that are now part of New South Wales used stringybark trees to make canoes called Kuueeyung.

In Arnhem Land, northern Australia, Yolngu peoples use various types of stringybark for painting on, including Eucalyptus tetradonta, known as Gaḏayka.

Early European colonists often used the bark for roofing and walls of huts.

== Types ==
There are many different species of stringybark, including:

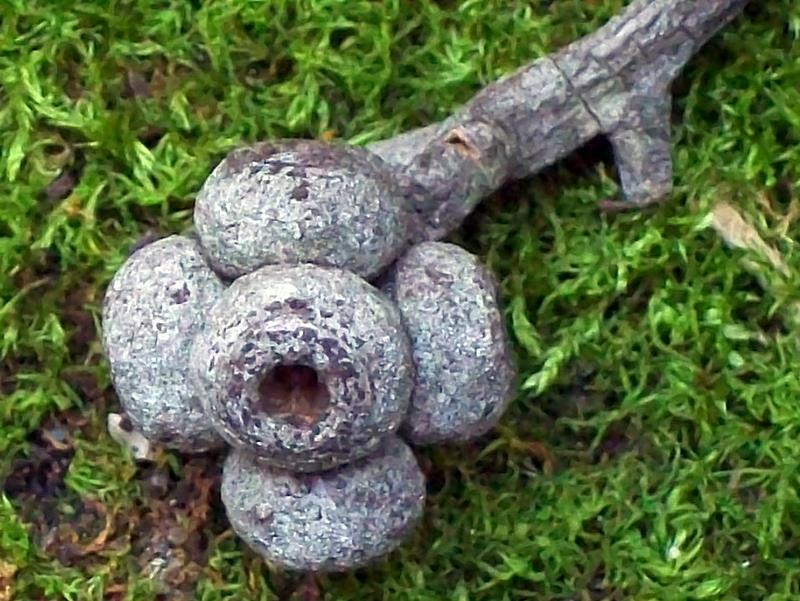
Typical crowded, stalkless gumnuts of Eucalyptus agglomerata

- Blue-leaved stringybark (Eucalyptus agglomerata)
- Brown stringybark (Eucalyptus baxteri, Eucalyptus laevopinea)
- Darwin stringybark, or messmate (Eucalyptus tetrodonta)
- Mealy stringybark or silver stringybark (Eucalyptus cephalocarpa)
- Narrow-leaved stringybark (Eucalyptus tenella)
- Messmate stringybark (Eucalyptus obliqua or Eucalyptus tetrodonta)
- Privet-leaved stringybark (Eucalyptus ligustrina)
- Red stringybark (Eucalyptus macrorhyncha)
- Thin-leaved stringybark (Eucalyptus eugenioides)
- Tindale's stringybark (Eucalyptus tindaliae)
- White stringybark (Eucalyptus globoidea, aka Eucalyptus oblonga)
- Wollemi stringybark (Eucalyptus expressa)
- Yellow stringybark (Eucalyptus acmenoides, Eucalyptus muelleriana, Eucalyptus umbra)
