= Golden grevillea =

Golden grevillea is a common name for several plants in the genus Grevillea and may refer to:

- Grevillea aurea, a shrub native to the Northern Territory in Australia
- Grevillea chrysophaea, a shrub which is endemic to Victoria in Australia
- Grevillea pteridifolia, a shrub native to Western Australia, Northern Territory and Queensland
