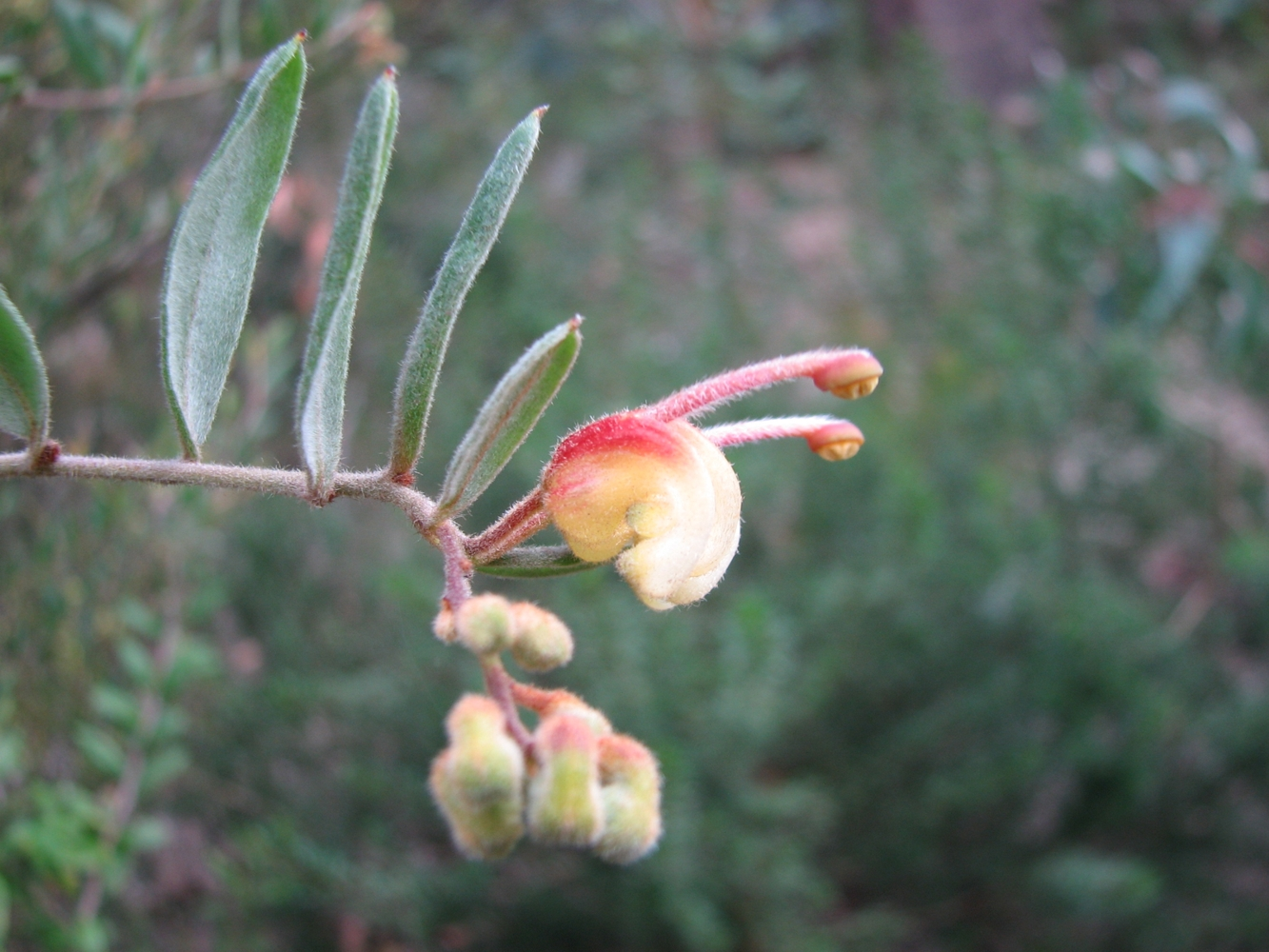
- Grevillea celata in Maranoa Gardens

Conservation status
- Vulnerable (EPBC Act)

Scientific classification
- Kingdom: Plantae
- Clade: Embryophytes
- Clade: Tracheophytes
- Clade: Spermatophytes
- Clade: Angiosperms
- Clade: Eudicots
- Order: Proteales
- Family: Proteaceae
- Genus: Grevillea
- Species: G. celata

Binomial name
- Grevillea celata Molyneux

Synonyms
- Grevillea aff. chrysophaea (Nowa Nowa)

= Grevillea celata =

Nowa Nowa grevillea

Species of plant endemic to Victoria, Australia

Grevillea celata, commonly known as Nowa Nowa grevillea or Colquhoun grevillea, is a species of flowering plant in the family Proteaceae and is endemic to a restricted part of Victoria in Australia. It is an erect and open to low, dense shrub with oblong, broadly elliptic or linear leaves, and red and yellow, or red, white and apricot-coloured, sometimes all yellow flowers.

== Description ==
Grevillea celata is an erect, open or low, dense shrub that typically grows to a height of 0.4–1.8 m (1 ft 4 in – 5 ft 11 in) and forms suckers. Its leaves are oblong, broadly elliptic or linear, mostly 20–44 mm (0.79–1.73 in) long and 4–18 mm (0.16–0.71 in) wide with the edges turned down or rolled under. The lower surface of the leaves is woolly-hairy. The flowers are usually arranged in groups of two to eight on the ends of branchlets or short side shoots on a rachis 1–5 mm (0.039–0.197 in) long, and are red and yellow, or red, white and apricot-coloured, sometimes all yellow, the pistil 18–25 mm (0.71–0.98 in) long, the style red with a green base and tip. Flowering occurs from July to February, and the fruit is a woolly-hairy follicle 14–16 mm (0.55–0.63 in) long.

Grevillea alpina and G. chrysophaea are similar species, but neither forms suckers.

== Taxonomy ==
Grevillea celata was first formally described in 1995 by Bill Molyneux in the journal Muelleria from specimens he collected from Colquhoun State Forest in south-eastern Victoria in 1993. The specific epithet (celata) means "hidden" or "concealed within", referring to the earlier confusion with G. alpina and G. chrysophaea.

== Distribution and habitat ==
Nowa Nowa grevillea grows in dry sclerophyll woodland in Colquhoun State Forest near Bruthen in south-eastern Victoria.

== Conservation status ==
The species is listed as vulnerable under the Australian Government Environment Protection and Biodiversity Conservation Act, as critically endangered in Victoria under the Flora and Fauna Guarantee Act 1988 and as "vulnerable in Victoria" on the Department of Sustainability and Environment's Advisory List of Rare Or Threatened Plants In Victoria, and a National Recovery Plan has been prepared. The main threats to the species include inapprpriate fire regimes, road works, and browsing by kangaroos.
