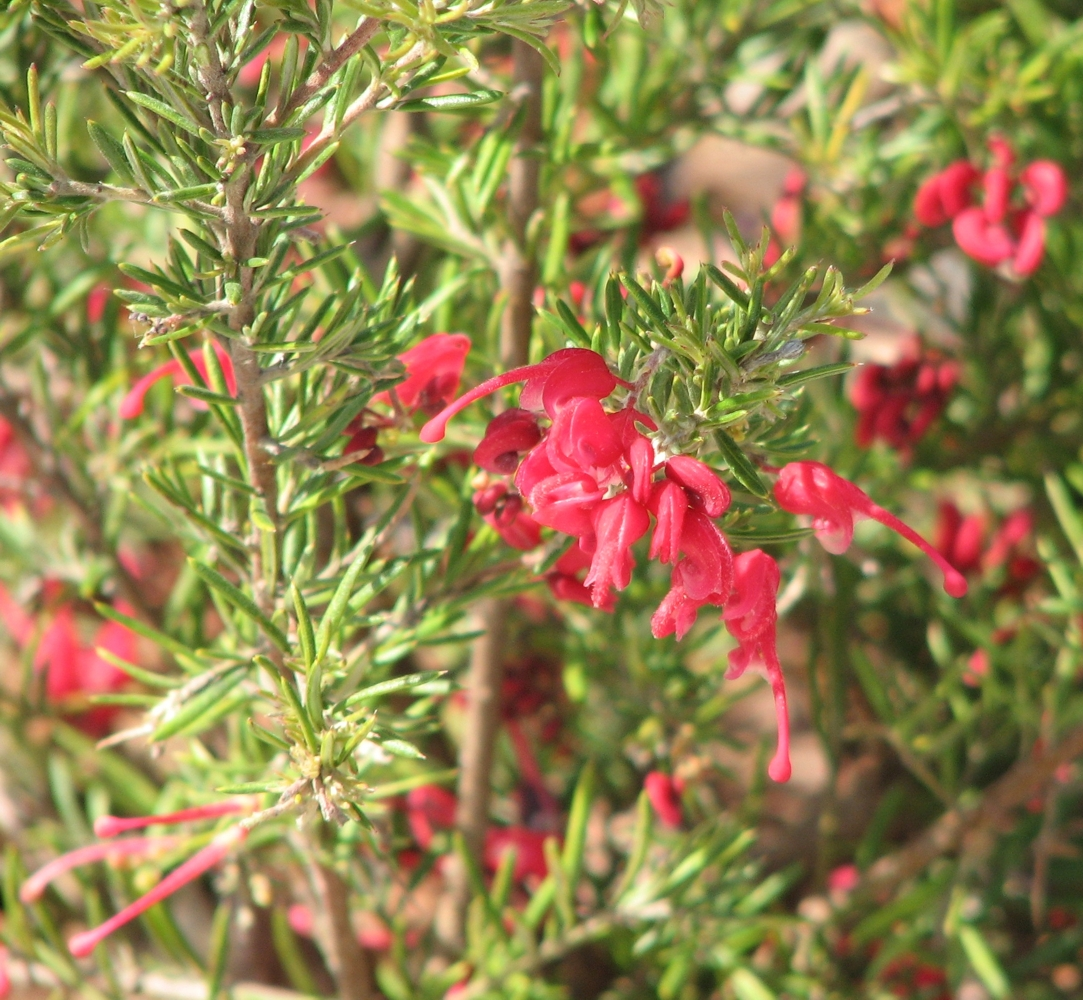
- in Royal Botanic Gardens, Cranbourne

Conservation status
- Least Concern (IUCN 3.1)

Scientific classification
- Kingdom: Plantae
- Clade: Embryophytes
- Clade: Tracheophytes
- Clade: Angiosperms
- Clade: Eudicots
- Order: Proteales
- Family: Proteaceae
- Genus: Grevillea
- Species: G. lavandulacea

Binomial name
- Grevillea lavandulacea Schltdl.

= Grevillea lavandulacea =

Species of shrub endemic to Australia

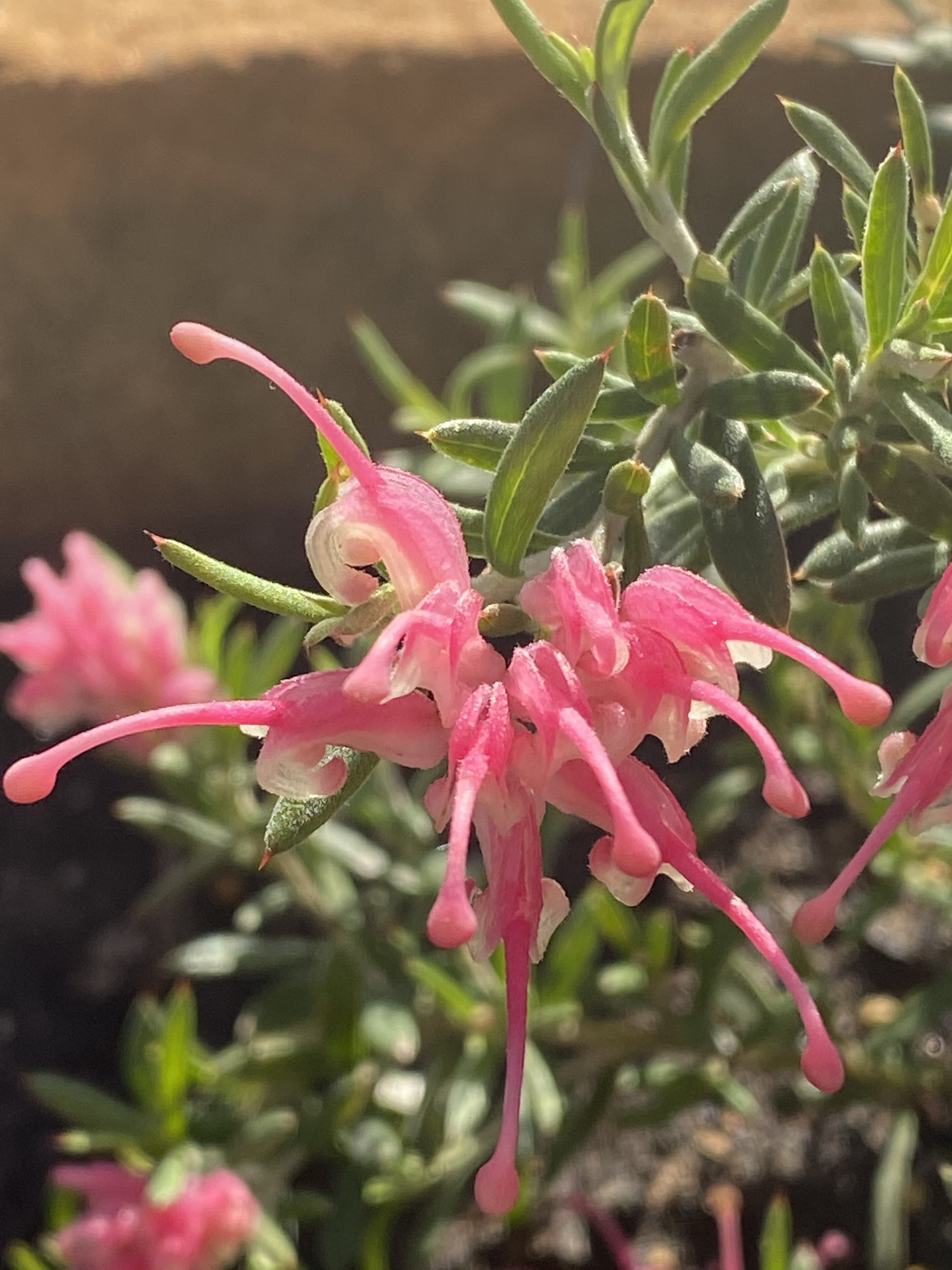
Flower detail

Grevillea lavandulacea, commonly known as lavender grevillea, is a species of flowering plant in the family Proteaceae and is endemic to southern continental Australia. It is a prostrate to spreading shrub with linear to elliptic leaves and clusters of pink to red flowers.

== Description ==
Grevillea lavandulacea is a spreading to prostrate shrub that typically grows to a height of 0.2–1.5 m (7.9 in – 4 ft 11.1 in). Its adult leaves are narrow elliptic to linear, 5–40 mm (0.20–1.57 in) long and 0.5–10 mm (0.020–0.394 in) wide with the edges turned down. The flowers are arranged on short side branches in clusters of mostly two to ten on a rachis 0.5–5 mm (0.020–0.197 in) long. They are red or pink, the outer surface silky hairy, the pistil 21.5–28.5 mm (0.85–1.12 in) long. Flowering occurs from late winter to early summer and the fruit is a narrowly oblong, softly-hairy follicle 111–15 mm (4.37–0.59 in) long.

== Taxonomy ==
Grevillea lavandulacea was first formally described by in 1847 by botanist Diederich Franz Leonhard von Schlechtendal in the journal Linnaea. The specific epithet (lavendulacea) means lavender.

In 2000, Robert Owen Makinson described two subspecies of G. lavendulacea in the Flora of Australia and the names are accepted by the Australian Plant Census:

- Grevillea lavandulacea Schltdl. subsp. lavandulacea;
- Grevillea lavandulacea subsp. rogersii (Maiden) Makinson that differs from the autonym in having a finely grainy upper surface of the leaves, the longest leaves more than 10 mm (0.39 in) long, and usually more than four flowers in each cluster.

== Distribution and habitat ==
Subspecies lavendulacea grows in a range of habitats from heathland to open woodland and dense shrubland and is found in the south-east of South Australia, including the Flinders Range, and west of the Grampians in western Victoria. Subspecies rogersii grows in shrubland, forest and woodland and is restricted to Kangaroo Island in South Australia.

== Use in horticulture ==
Grevillea lavandulacea is cultivated as an ornamental plant, for use in well draining and drought tolerant gardens. A number of naturally occurring forms have been introduced into cultivation from localities including Adelaide Hills, Black Range, Flinders Ranges, Little Desert, Mount Compass, Penola, Victor Harbor and Woakwine. The commonly grown cultivar G. lavendulacea 'Tanunda' is thought to have originated from Aldinga in South Australia, rather than Tanunda in the Barossa Valley where a different form occurs.
