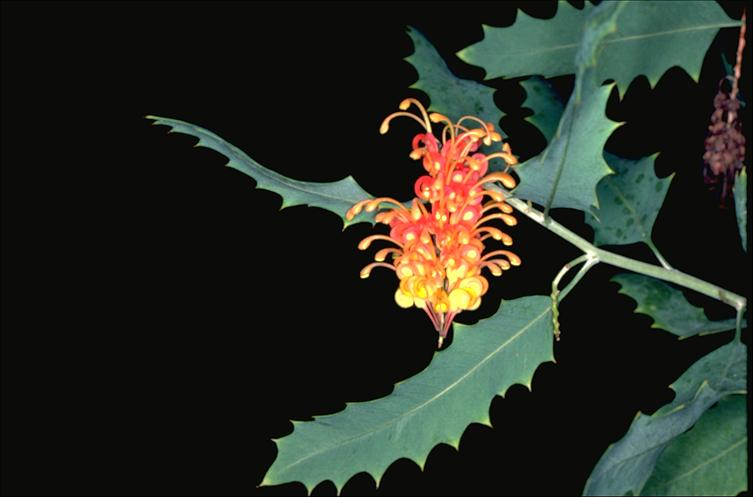
- Grevillea aurea in the Australian National Botanic Gardens

Conservation status
- Least Concern (IUCN 3.1)

Scientific classification
- Kingdom: Plantae
- Clade: Embryophytes
- Clade: Tracheophytes
- Clade: Spermatophytes
- Clade: Angiosperms
- Clade: Eudicots
- Order: Proteales
- Family: Proteaceae
- Genus: Grevillea
- Species: G. aurea

Binomial name
- Grevillea aurea Olde & Marriott

= Grevillea aurea =

Golden grevillea

Species of shrub native to Australia

Grevillea aurea, commonly known as golden grevillea or Death Adder Gorge grevillea, is a species of flowering plant in the family Proteaceae and is endemic to the Northern Territory in Australia. It is a tall, open shrub leaves that have nine to twenty-seven lobes or teeth, and flowers that are red at first, becoming orange-red to yellow as they age.

== Description ==
Grevillea aurea is a tall, open shrub that typically grows to a height of 2–6 m (6 ft 7 in – 19 ft 8 in). Its leaves are oblong in outline, 70–160 mm (2.8–6.3 in) long and 15–45 mm (0.59–1.77 in) wide with nine to twenty-seven lobes or teeth on the edges. The flowers are arranged on the ends of branches on a rachis 40–160 mm (1.6–6.3 in) long and are brick red when they first open, later orange-red to yellow, with an orange to yellow style. The pistil is 17–23 mm (0.67–0.91 in) long and the ovary is glabrous. Flowering occurs from April to August and the fruit is an elliptic follicle 10–17 mm (0.39–0.67 in) long.

== Taxonomy ==
Grevillea aurea was formally described in 1993 by Peter M. Olde and Neil R. Marriott in the journal Telopea from specimens collected in Death Adder Gorge by Donald McGillivray and Clyde Robert Dunlop in 1978. The specific epithet (aurea) means "golden".

== Distribution and habitat ==
Golden grevillea grows in heath, scrub and forest understorey on sandstone escarpments and ridges in three separate parts of Kakadu National Park in the Northern Territory.

== Conservation status ==
Grevillea aurea is listed as least concern on the IUCN Red List of Threatened Species. Although it has a restricted distribution, it is presumed to currently have a stable population. There are no known major threats to the population, either currently or in the near future.
