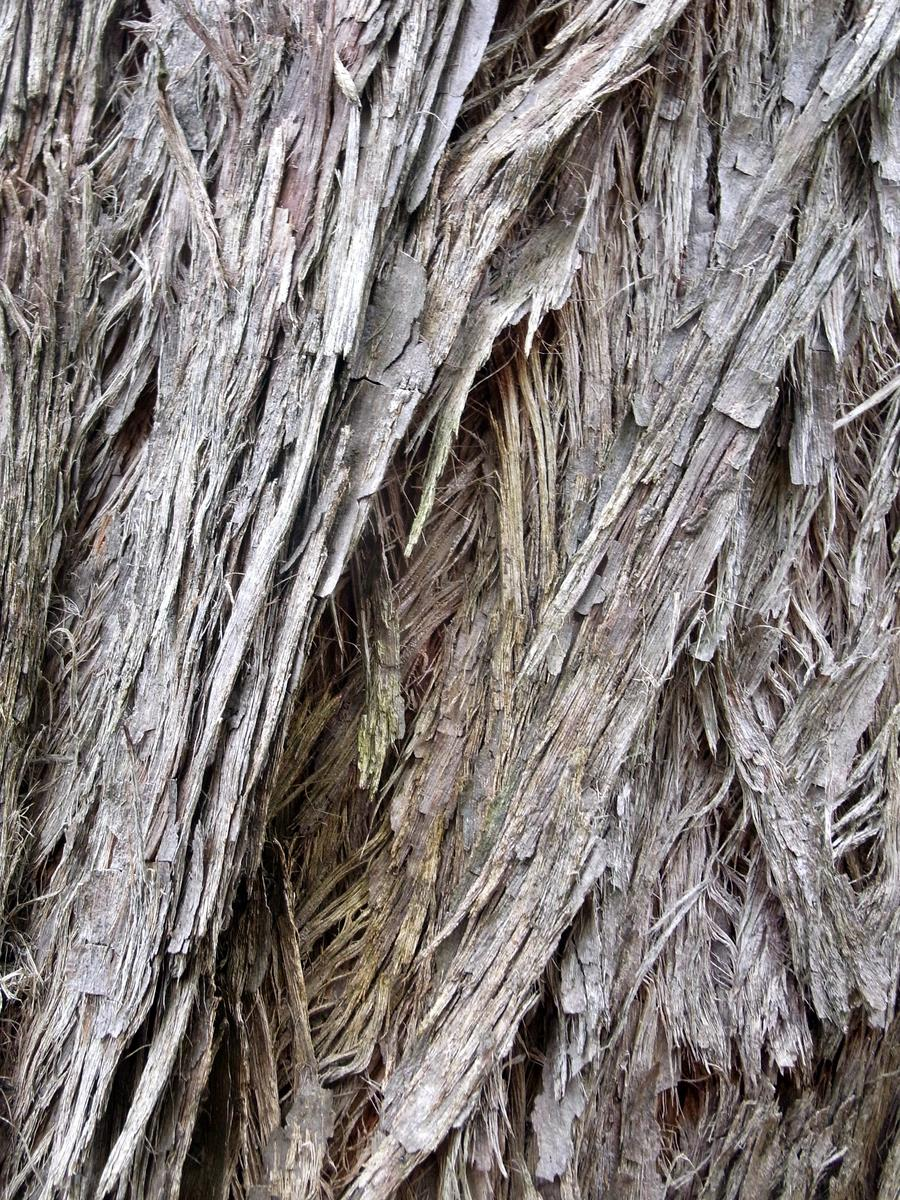
- Bark of Eucalyptus tenella in the ANBG

Scientific classification
- Kingdom: Plantae
- Clade: Tracheophytes
- Clade: Angiosperms
- Clade: Eudicots
- Clade: Rosids
- Order: Myrtales
- Family: Myrtaceae
- Genus: Eucalyptus
- Species: E. tenella

Binomial name
- Eucalyptus tenella L.A.S.Johnson & K.D.Hill

= Eucalyptus tenella =

Narrow-leaved stringybark

Species of eucalyptus

Eucalyptus tenella, commonly known as narrow-leaved stringybark, is a species of small to medium-sized tree that is endemic to New South Wales. It has stringy bark, narrow lance-shaped to linear leaves, flower buds in group of seven to fifteen, white flowers and hemispherical fruit.

== Description ==
Eucalyptus tenella is a tree that typically grows to a height of 15 m (49 ft) and forms a lignotuber. It has thick, fibrous, furrowed, stringy bark usually coloured grey over reddish brown. Young plants and coppice regrowth have glossy green leaves that a paler on the lower surface, narrow lance-shaped to linear, 25–70 mm (0.98–2.76 in) long and 3–15 mm (0.12–0.59 in) wide. Adult leaves are narrow lance-shaped to linear or curved, 50–150 mm (2.0–5.9 in) long and 5–20 mm (0.20–0.79 in) wide on a petiole 3–15 mm (0.12–0.59 in) long. The flower buds are arranged in leaf axils in groups of seven to fifteen on an unbranched peduncle 4–10 mm (0.16–0.39 in) long, the individual buds sessile or on pedicels up to 3 mm (0.12 in) long. Mature buds are oval to spindle-shaped, 4–60 mm (0.16–2.36 in) long and 2–3 mm (0.079–0.118 in) wide with a conical to rounded operculum. Flowering occurs from September to March and the flowers are white. The fruit is a woody spherical or hemispherical capsule 5–6 mm (0.20–0.24 in) long and 5–7 mm (0.20–0.28 in) wide with the valves near rim level.

== Taxonomy and naming ==
Eucalyptus tenella was first formally described in 1991 by Lawrie Johnson and Ken Hill in the journal Telopea from specimens Johnson collected near Capertee in 1968. The specific epithet (tenella) is from the Latin tenellus meaning "somewhat delicate", referring to the small leaves.

== Distribution and habitat ==
Narrow-leaved stringybark grows in dry woodland in shallow soils between Rylstone and Nowra.
