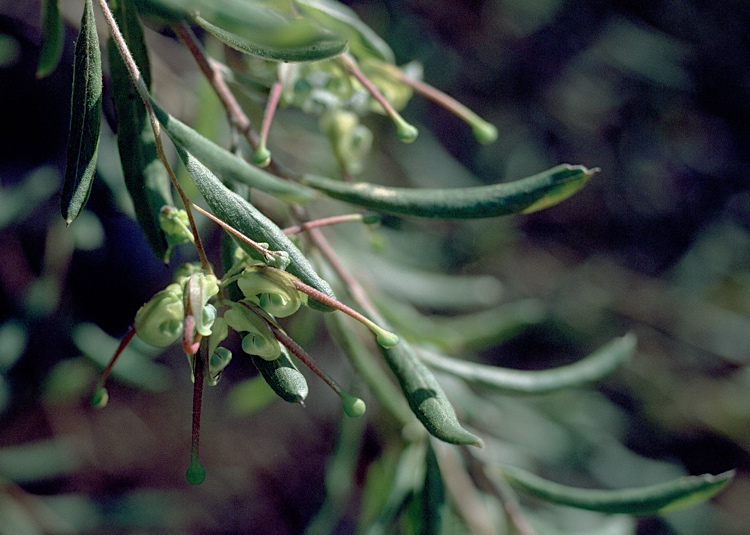
- In North Coast Regional Botanic Garden

Conservation status
- Least Concern (IUCN 3.1)

Scientific classification
- Kingdom: Plantae
- Clade: Embryophytes
- Clade: Tracheophytes
- Clade: Angiosperms
- Clade: Eudicots
- Order: Proteales
- Family: Proteaceae
- Genus: Grevillea
- Species: G. granulifera

Binomial name
- Grevillea granulifera (McGill.) Olde & Marriott

Synonyms
- Grevillea obtusiflora subsp. granulifera McGill.

= Grevillea granulifera =

Species of shrub endemic to Australia

Grevillea granulifera is a species of flowering plant in the family Proteaceae and is endemic to eastern New South Wales. It is a shrub with narrowly elliptic leaves and clusters of pinkish-red and creamy-white flowers.

== Description ==
Grevillea granulifera is a rounded shrub, typically up to 1 m (3 ft 3 in) high or sometimes an erect shrub to 4.5 m (15 ft) with wand-like stems. The leaves are narrowly elliptic, 15–60 mm (0.59–2.36 in) long 2–11 mm (0.079–0.433 in) wide. The upper surface of the leaves is finely grainy, the lower surface silky-hairy and the edges usually curved downwards. The flowers are arranged in groups of six to sixteen on a woolly-hairy rachis 2–13 mm (0.079–0.512 in) long. The flowers are pinkish-red and creamy-white with a reddish-brown to burgundy-coloured, green-tipped style, the pistil 21–24 mm (0.83–0.94 in) long. Flowering occurs from September to November and the fruit is a narrowly elliptic, hairy, prominently ribbed follicle about 14 mm (0.55 in) long.

== Taxonomy ==
This grevillea was first formally described in 1986 by Donald McGillivray who gave it the name Grevillea obtusiflora subsp. granulifera in his New Names in Grevillea (Proteaceae) from specimens collected by Lawrie Johnson near Mount George in 1980. In 1994, Peter M. Olde and Neil R. Marriott raised the subspecies to species level as Grevillea granulifera in the journal Telopea. The specific epithet (granulifera) means "bearing small grains".

== Distribution and habitat ==
Grevillea granulifera grows in forest, often on ridge tops and hillsides and is found between Wollomombi Falls, Barrington Tops and Wingham.

== Conservation status ==
Grevillea granulifera has been listed as least concern on the IUCN Red List of Threatened Species. Although the species has a fairly restricted distribution, where it occurs in small, disjunct populations, it is not under immediate threat and its population is largely presumed to be stable. It faces localised threats in parts of its distribution, though these are not severe enough to place the species in a threatened category. In Wollomombi, it likely faces competition with introduced pasture and riparian weeds and in Booreal, it is threatened by road-side threats and land clearing for agriculture.
