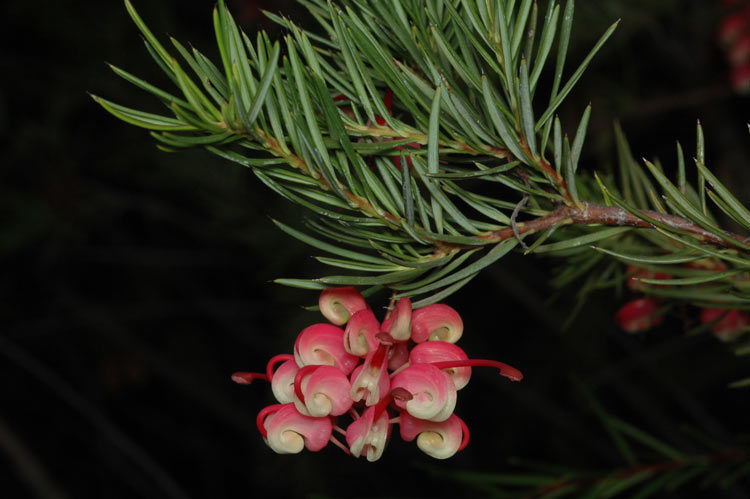
- Subspecies rosmarinifolia

Scientific classification
- Kingdom: Plantae
- Clade: Tracheophytes
- Clade: Angiosperms
- Clade: Eudicots
- Order: Proteales
- Family: Proteaceae
- Genus: Grevillea
- Species: G. rosmarinifolia

Binomial name
- Grevillea rosmarinifolia A.Cunn.

= Grevillea rosmarinifolia =

Species of shrub endemic to Australia

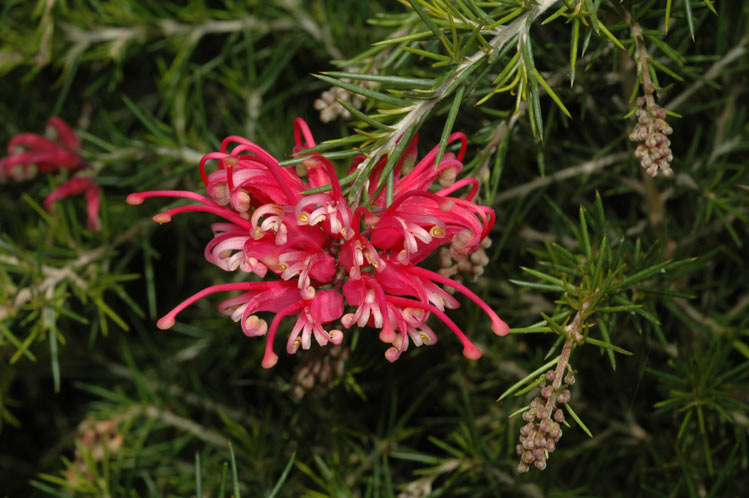
Subspecies glabella

Grevillea rosmarinifolia, commonly known as rosemary grevillea, is a species of flowering plant in the family Proteaceae and is endemic to south-eastern continental Australia and naturalised in other parts of the country. It is usually an erect, compact to open shrub with linear, narrowly elliptic or narrowly oblong leaves with the edges rolled under, and loose clusters of pink to red flowers.

== Description ==
Grevillea rosmarinifolia is usually an erect, compact to open, sometimes low shrub that typically grows to a height of 0.3–2 m (1 ft 0 in – 6 ft 7 in). Its leaves are linear to narrowly elliptic or narrowly oblong, 8–38 mm (0.31–1.50 in) long and 0.7–3 mm (0.028–0.118 in) wide with the edges rolled under, usually concealing the lower surface. The flowers are arranged on the ends of the branches, usually in groups of 4 to 12 on a glabrous rachis 2–8 mm (0.079–0.315 in) long. The flowers are pink to red, the pistil 15–22.5 mm (0.59–0.89 in) long. Flowering occurs from August to December, and the fruit is a hairy, oblong follicle 8–11 mm (0.31–0.43 in) long.

== Taxonomy ==
Grevillea rosmarinifolia was first formally described in 1825 by Allan Cunningham, in Barron Field's book, Geographical Memoirs on New South Wales, from specimens collected on the banks of the Coxs River. The specific epithet (rosmarinifolia) means "rosemary-leaved".

In 2000, Robert Owen Makinson described two subspecies of G. rosmarinifolia, and the names are accepted by the Australian Plant Census:

- Grevillea rosmarinifolia subsp. glabella (R.Br.) Makinson is a much-branched, rounded shrub typically 0.8–2 m (2 ft 7 in – 6 ft 7 in) high with linear to more or less cylindrical, crowded leaves 8–15 mm (0.31–0.59 in) long and 0.7–0.8 mm (0.028–0.031 in) wide, the lower surface fully concealed.
- Grevillea rosmarinifolia subsp. rosmarinifolia (A.Cunn.) is a compact to open shrub typically 0.3–2 m (1 ft 0 in – 6 ft 7 in) high with usually well-spaced, linear to narrowly elliptic to narrowly oblong leaves 0.8–3.8 mm (0.031–0.150 in) long and 0.7–3 mm (0.028–0.118 in) wide, the lower surface sometimes partly exposed.

== Distribution and habitat ==
Rosemary grevillea is native to New South Wales and Victoria, but is naturalised in South Australia and the Australian Capital Territory. Subspecies glabella grows in mallee or shrubland in sandy soils in the Rankins Springs to Griffith area of southern New South Wales and in the Little Desert area of western Victoria. Subspecies rosmarinifolia grows in open forest or woodland in montane areas of south-eastern New South Wales and in isolated areas of inland Victoria, between Gippsland, Melbourne, Skipton and the Brisbane Ranges.

== Use in horticulture ==
This grevillea is common in cultivation and all forms are readily grown from cuttings. The type form from the Coxs River is thought to be extinct in the field, but was rediscovered by Donald McGillivray growing outside the Royal Botanic Garden Edinburgh in 1969. Grevillea rosmarinifolia prefers full sun. It is drought tolerant and hardy down to −10 °C (14 °F). In the UK it has gained the Royal Horticultural Society's Award of Garden Merit.
