= Grevillea kedumbensis =

Conservation status
- Endangered (IUCN 3.1)

Scientific classification
- Kingdom: Plantae
- Clade: Embryophytes
- Clade: Tracheophytes
- Clade: Angiosperms
- Clade: Eudicots
- Order: Proteales
- Family: Proteaceae
- Genus: Grevillea
- Species: G. kedumbensis

Binomial name
- Grevillea kedumbensis (McGill.) Olde & Marriott

Synonyms
- Grevillea obtusiflora subsp. kedumbensis McGill.

Species of shrub endemic to Australia

Grevillea kedumbensis is a species of flowering plant in the family Proteaceae and is endemic to a restricted locale in the Great Dividing Range in central New South Wales in Australia. It is a twiggy shrub with narrowly elliptic to egg-shaped leaves with the narrower end towards the base, and clusters of hairy green to cream-coloured flowers.

== Description ==
Grevillea kedumbensis is a twiggy, lignotuber-forming shrub that typically grows to a height of 0.2–1 m (7.9 in – 3 ft 3.4 in) 20 to 1 m (787 to 39 in) high. The leaves are narrowly elliptic to egg-shaped with the narrower end towards the base, 10–30 mm (0.39–1.18 in) long and 1–5 mm (0.039–0.197 in) wide on a short petiole. The upper surface of the leaves is grainy and the lower surface is covered with silky hairs. The flowers are arranged in groups of 12 to 20 on a silky-hairy rachis 2–5 mm (0.079–0.197 in) long. The flowers are green to cream-coloured and hairy, the pistil 12.5–17.5 mm (0.49–0.69 in) long and the style pink to dull red with a green tip. Flowering mainly occurs in winter and spring, though it can occur at other times of the year.

== Taxonomy ==
First collected by Alec Blombery in the Kedumba Valley in 1986, this grevillea was first formally described in 1986 by Donald McGillivray, who gave it the name Grevillea obtusiflora subsp. kedumbensis in his New names in Grevillea (Proteaceae). In 1994, Peter M. Olde and Neil R. Marriott raised the subspecies to species level as Grevillea kedumbensis in the journal Telopea.

== Distribution and habitat ==
Grevillea kedumbensis grows in dry forest and is restricted to the area between the Kedumba Valley below Katoomba and Scotts Main Range near Yerranderie.
