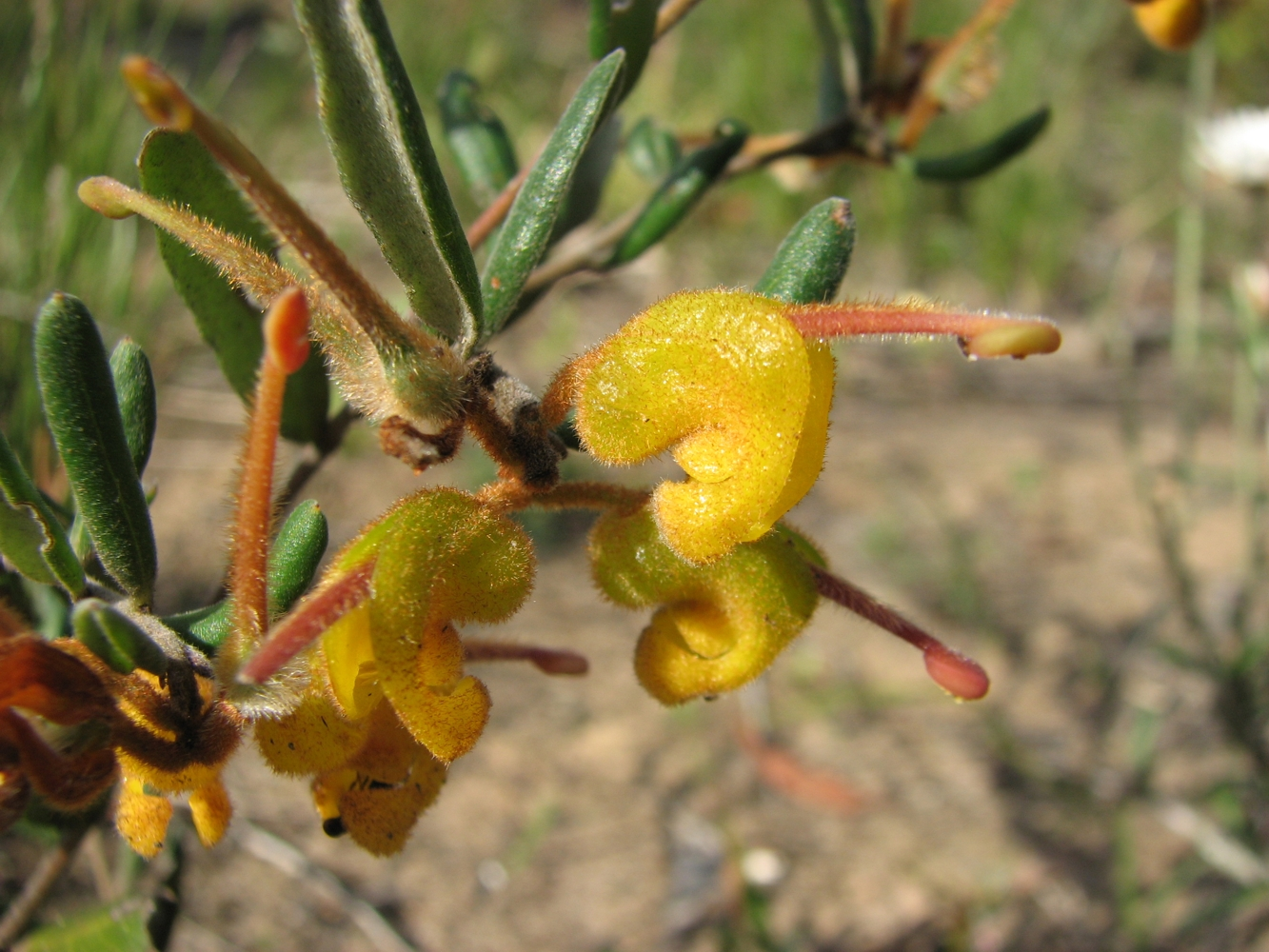
- Grevillea chrysophaea, Brisbane Ranges National Park, Victoria

Scientific classification
- Kingdom: Plantae
- Clade: Embryophytes
- Clade: Tracheophytes
- Clade: Spermatophytes
- Clade: Angiosperms
- Clade: Eudicots
- Order: Proteales
- Family: Proteaceae
- Genus: Grevillea
- Species: G. chrysophaea

Binomial name
- Grevillea chrysophaea F.Muell. ex Meisn.

= Grevillea chrysophaea =

Golden grevillea

Species of shrub endemic to Victoria, Australia

Grevillea chrysophaea, commonly known as golden grevillea, is a species of flowering plant in the family Proteaceae and is endemic to Victoria in Australia. It is a spreading shrub with oblong to almost linear leaves, and dull to golden yellow flowers with a red or orange-red style.

== Description ==
Grevillea chrysophaea is a spreading, or occasionally prostrate, shrub that typically grows to a height of 0.3–2.5 m (1 ft 0 in – 8 ft 2 in). Its leaves are oblong to almost linear, 15–60 mm (0.59–2.36 in) long and 3–15 mm (0.12–0.59 in) wide with the edges turned down or rolled under. The upper surface of the leaves is glabrous or softly-hairy and the lower surface is woolly to velvety hairy. The flowers are arranged in groups of two to eight on the ends of branchlets and are dull to golden yellow, the pistil 15–21.5 mm (0.59–0.85 in) long with a red or orange-red style. Flowering mostly occurs from June to November and the fruit is a hairy, elliptic follicle 11–13 mm (0.43–0.51 in) long.

== Taxonomy ==
Grevillea chrysophaea was first formally described in 1854 by Carl Meissner in the journal Linnaea: ein Journal für die Botanik in ihrem ganzen Umfange, oder Beiträge zur Pflanzenkunde from an unpublished description by Ferdinand von Mueller.

== Distribution and habitat ==
Golden grevillea usually grows in eucalypt or banksia woodland in the Brisbane Ranges and in Gippsland in southern Victoria.

== Conservation status ==
The species is listed as is listed as vulnerable in Victoria under the Flora and Fauna Guarantee Act 1988 and is listed as rare in Victoria on the Department of Sustainability and Environment's 2014 Advisory List of Rare Or Threatened Plants In Victoria.
