= List of butterflies of Australia =

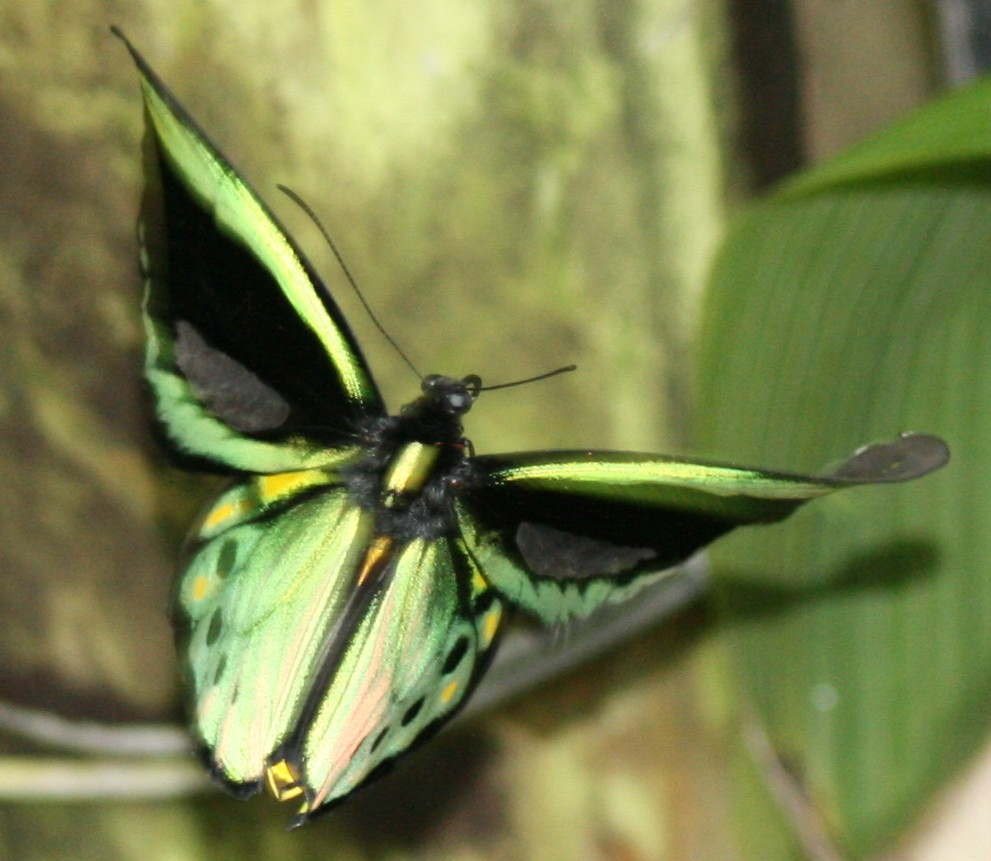
Cairns birdwing (Ornithoptera euphorion): Australia's largest endemic butterfly

Australia has more than 400 species of butterfly, the majority of which are continental species, and more than a dozen endemic species from remote islands administered by various Australian territorial governments. The largest butterflies in the world are endemic to the Australasian realm. They are the birdwings—Ornithoptera and other genera—of the tribe Troidini of the swallowtail butterfly family, Papilionidae.

== Papilionidae: swallowtails ==
Family: Papilionidae (swallowtails) – 18+2 species [*2 non-continental species]

=== Papilioninae ===
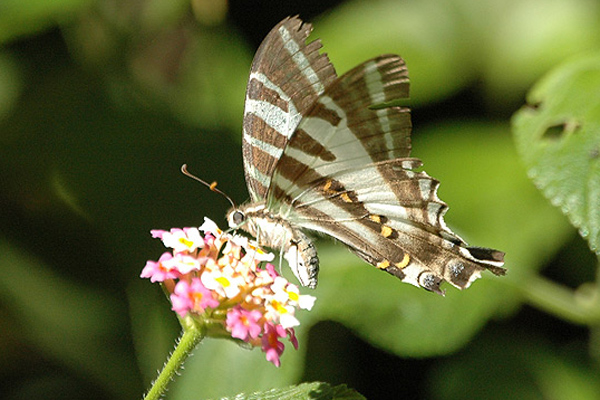
Four-barred swordtail

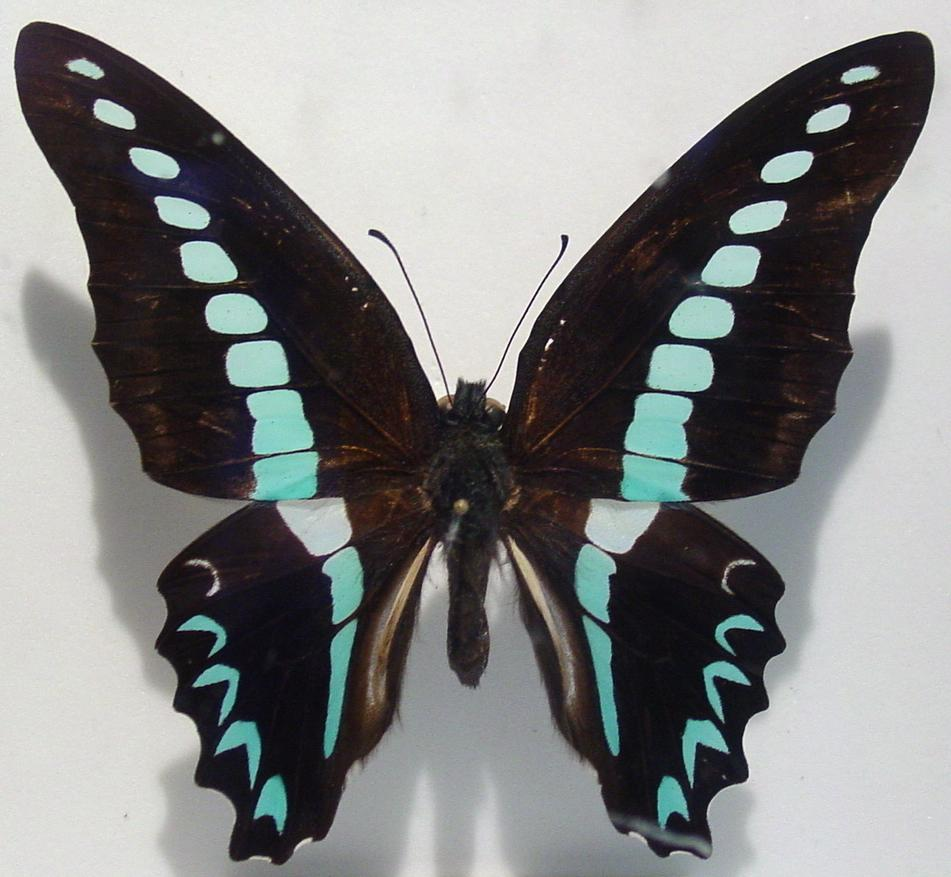
Blue triangle

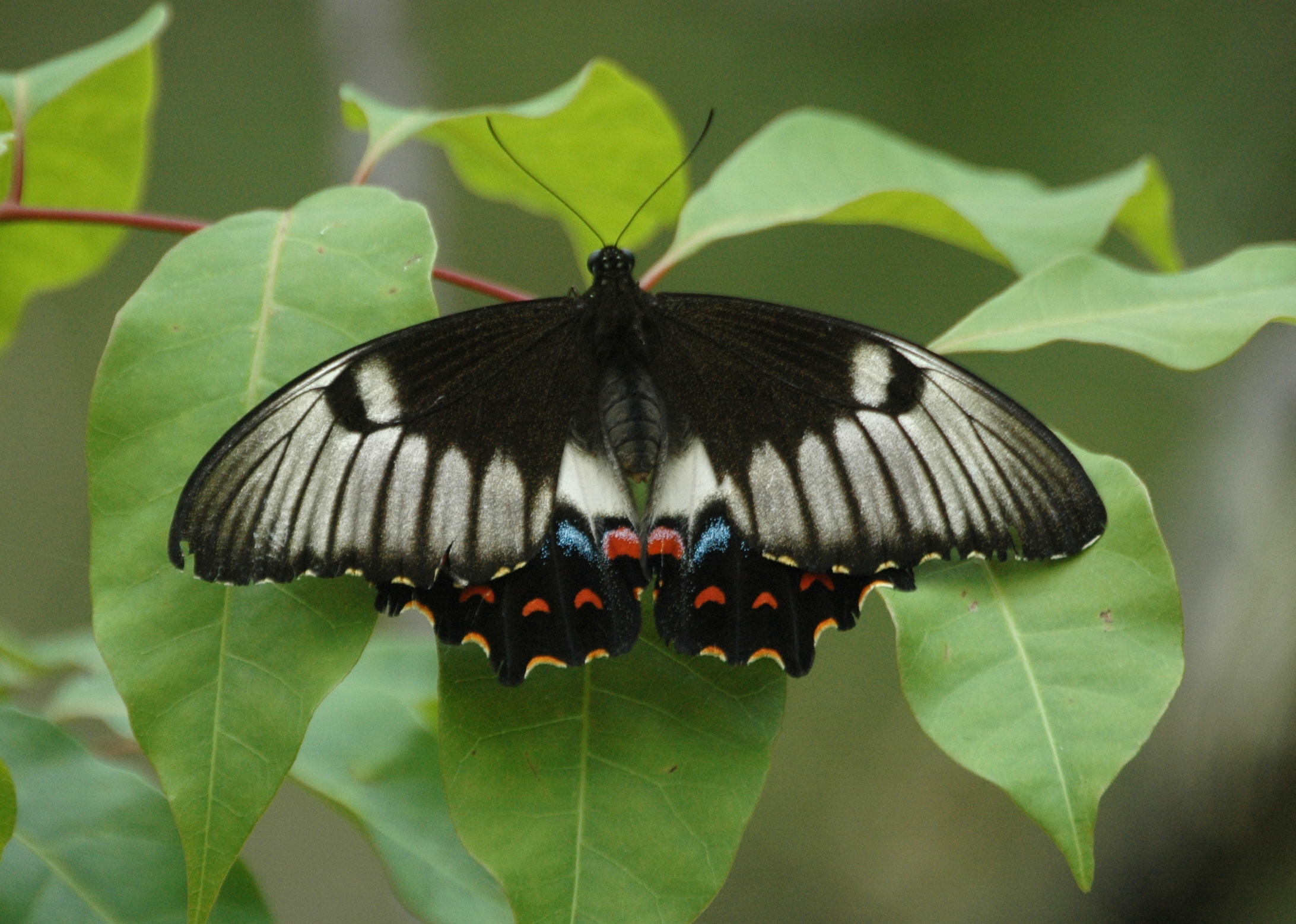
Orchard swallowtail

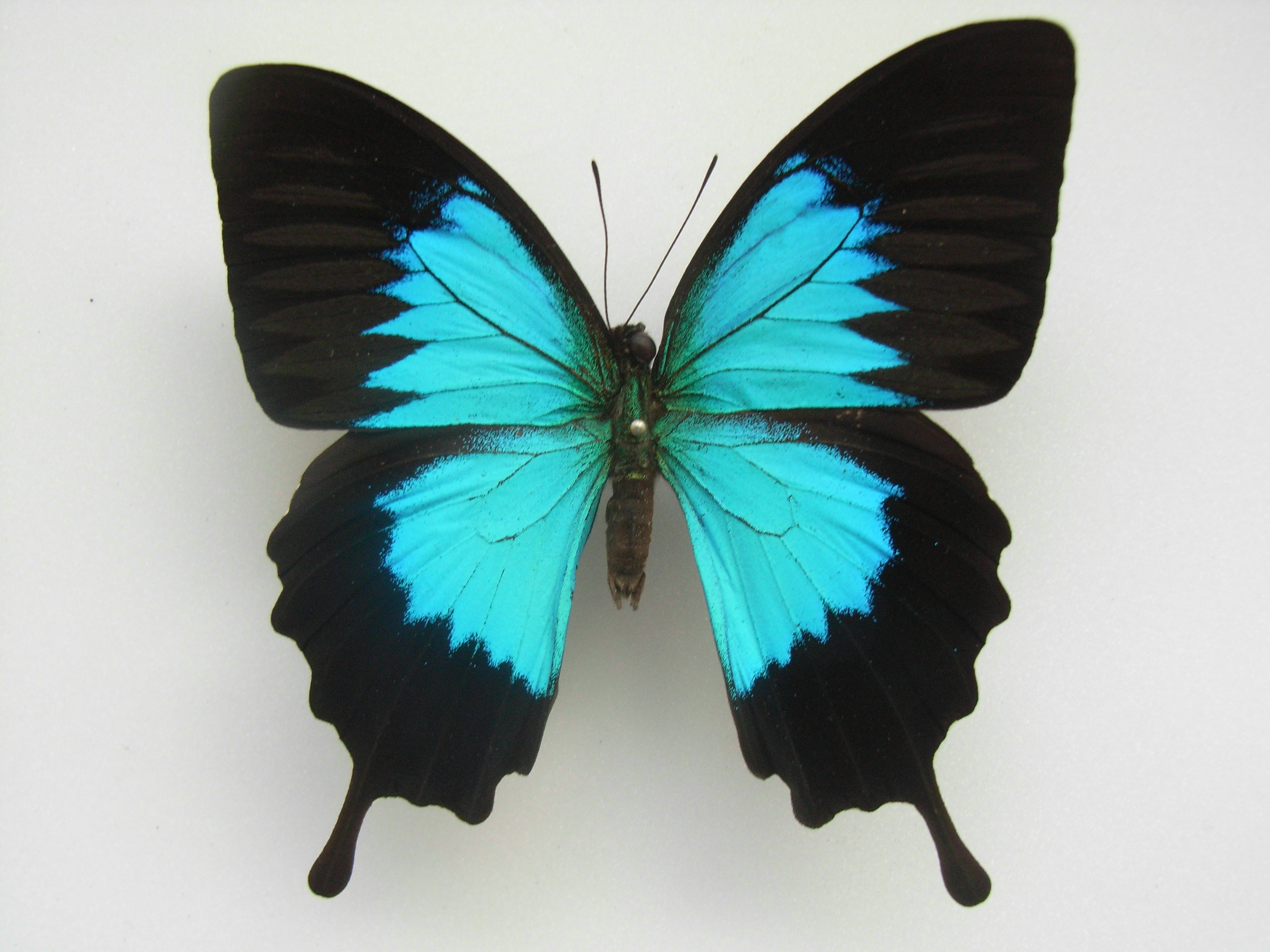
Ulysses swallowtail

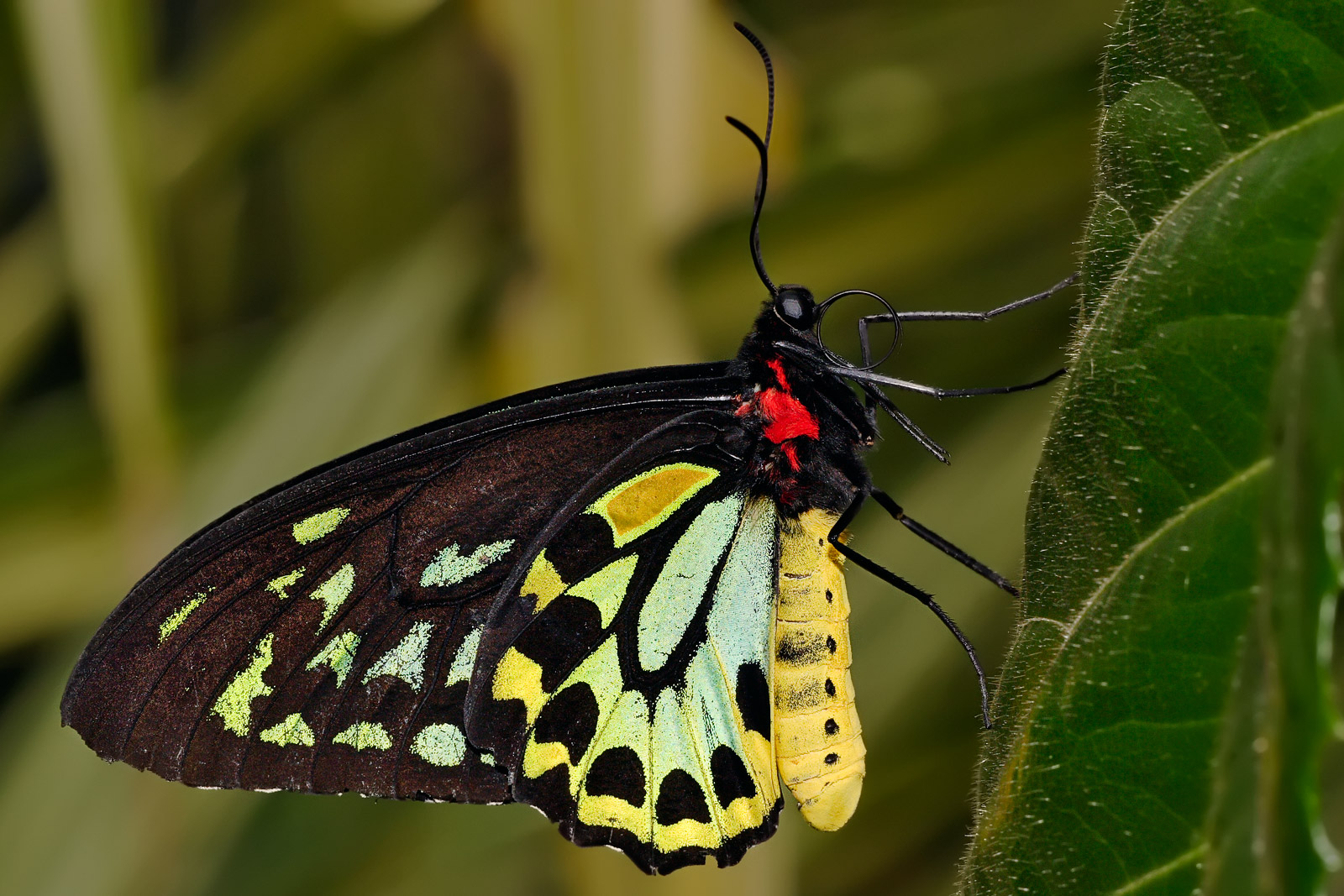
Cairns birdwing

subfamily: Papilioninae

tribe: Leptocircini (formerly Graphiini)

genus: Protographium
- Four-barred swordtail, Protographium leosthenes (Doubleday, 1846) – pictured

P. l. leosthenes (Doubleday, 1846)
P. l. geimbia (Tindale, 1927)

genus: Graphium (swordtails)
- Five-barred or chain swordtail, Graphium aristeus (Stoll, 1780)
- Macleay's swordtail, Graphium macleayanus (Leach, 1814)

G. m. macleayanus (Leach, 1814)
G. m. moggana (Couchman, 1965)

- Blue triangle, Graphium sarpedon (Linnaeus, 1758) – pictured
- Pale triangle, Graphium eurypylus (Linnaeus, 1758)

G. e. lycaon (C. & R. Felder, 1865)
G. e. nyctimus (Waterhouse & Lyell, 1914)
G. e. lycanoides (Rothschild, 1895)

- Green triangle, Graphium macfarlanei (Butler, 1877)
- Green-spotted triangle, Graphium agamemnon (Linnaeus, 1758)

tribe: Papilionini (fluted swallowtails)

genus: Papilio (Linnaeus, 1758)
- Dainty swallowtail, Papilio anactus (W. S. Macleay, 1826)
- Orchard swallowtail, Papilio aegeus (Donovan, 1805) – pictured

P. a. aegeus (Donovan, 1805)
P. a. ormenus (Guérin-Méneville, 1830)

- Ambrax swallowtail, Papilio ambrax (Boisduval, 1832)
- Fuscus swallowtail, Papilio fuscus (Goeze, 1779)

P. f. canopus (Westwood, 1842)
P. f. capaneus (Westwood, 1843)
P. f. indicatus (Butler, 1876)

- Ulysses swallowtail, Papilio ulysses (Linnaeus, 1758) – pictured
- Chequered swallowtail, Papilio demoleus (Linnaeus, 1758)
- *Christmas swallowtail, Papilio memnon (Linnaeus, 1758) [*native to Christmas Island]
- *Norfolk swallowtail, Papilio amynthor (Boisduval, 1859) [*native to Norfolk Island]

tribe: Troidini (Aristolochia-eating swallowtails)

genus: Cressida
- Clearwing swallowtail, Cressida cressida (Fabricius, 1775)

C. c. cressida (Fabricius, 1775)

genus: Ornithoptera (birdwings)
- Richmond birdwing, Ornithoptera richmondia (Gray, 1853)
- Cairns birdwing, Ornithoptera euphorion (Gray, 1853) – pictured
- New Guinea or common green birdwing, Ornithoptera priamus (Linnaeus, 1758)

O. p. poseidon (Doubleday, 1847)
O. p. pronomus (Gray, 1853)
O. p. macalpinei (Moulds, 1974)

genus: Pachliopta
- Red-bodied swallowtail, Pachliopta polydorus (Linnaeus, 1763)

== Pieridae: whites and yellows ==
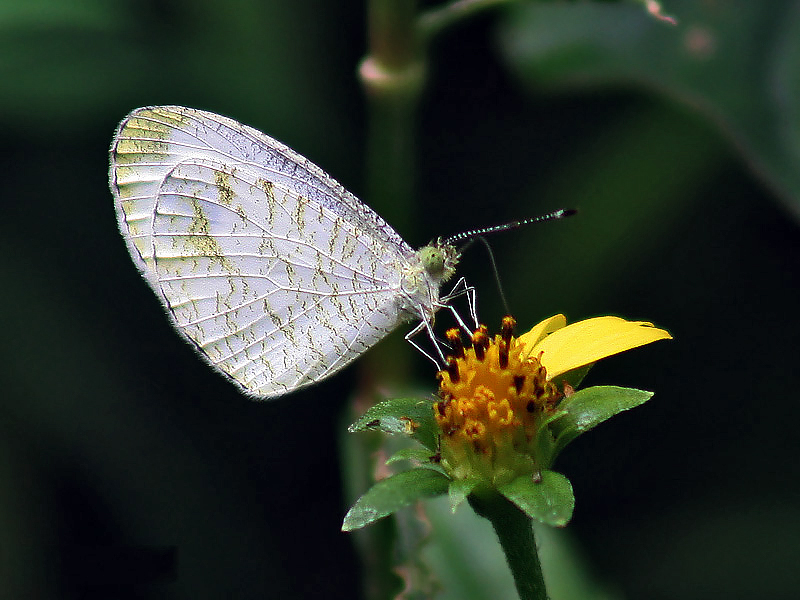
Black-spotted white

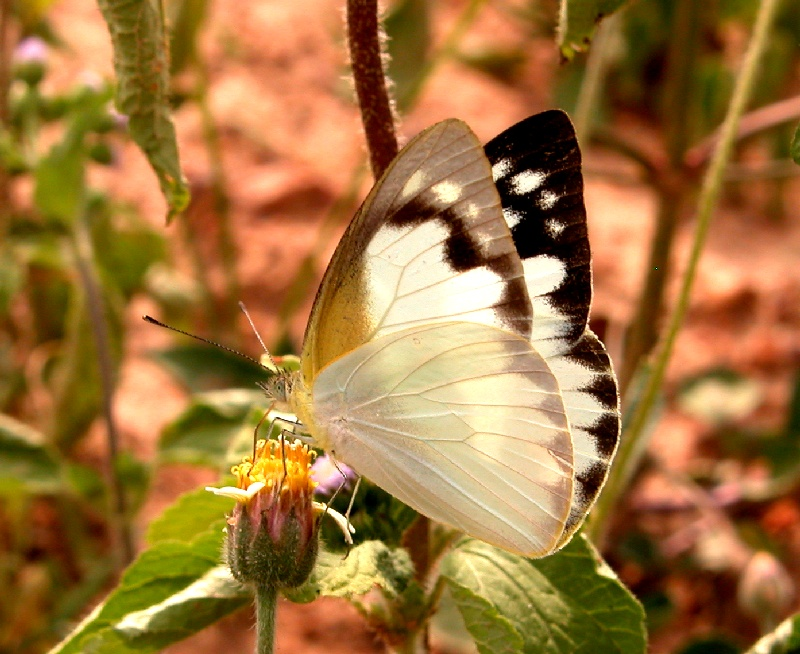
White albatross

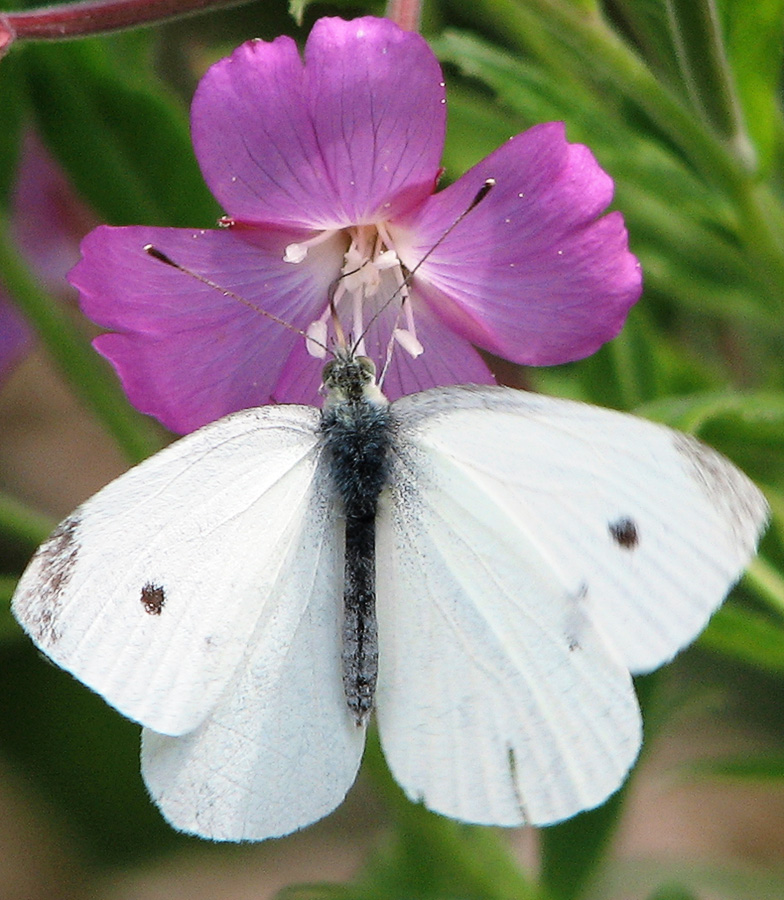
Small cabbage white

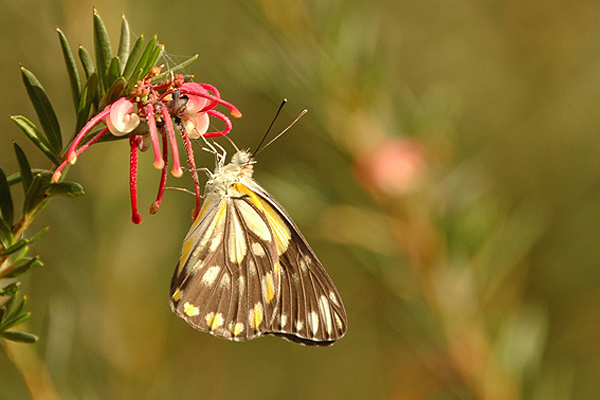
Caper white

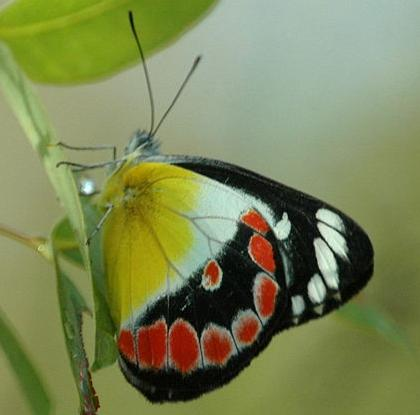
Scarlet Jezebel

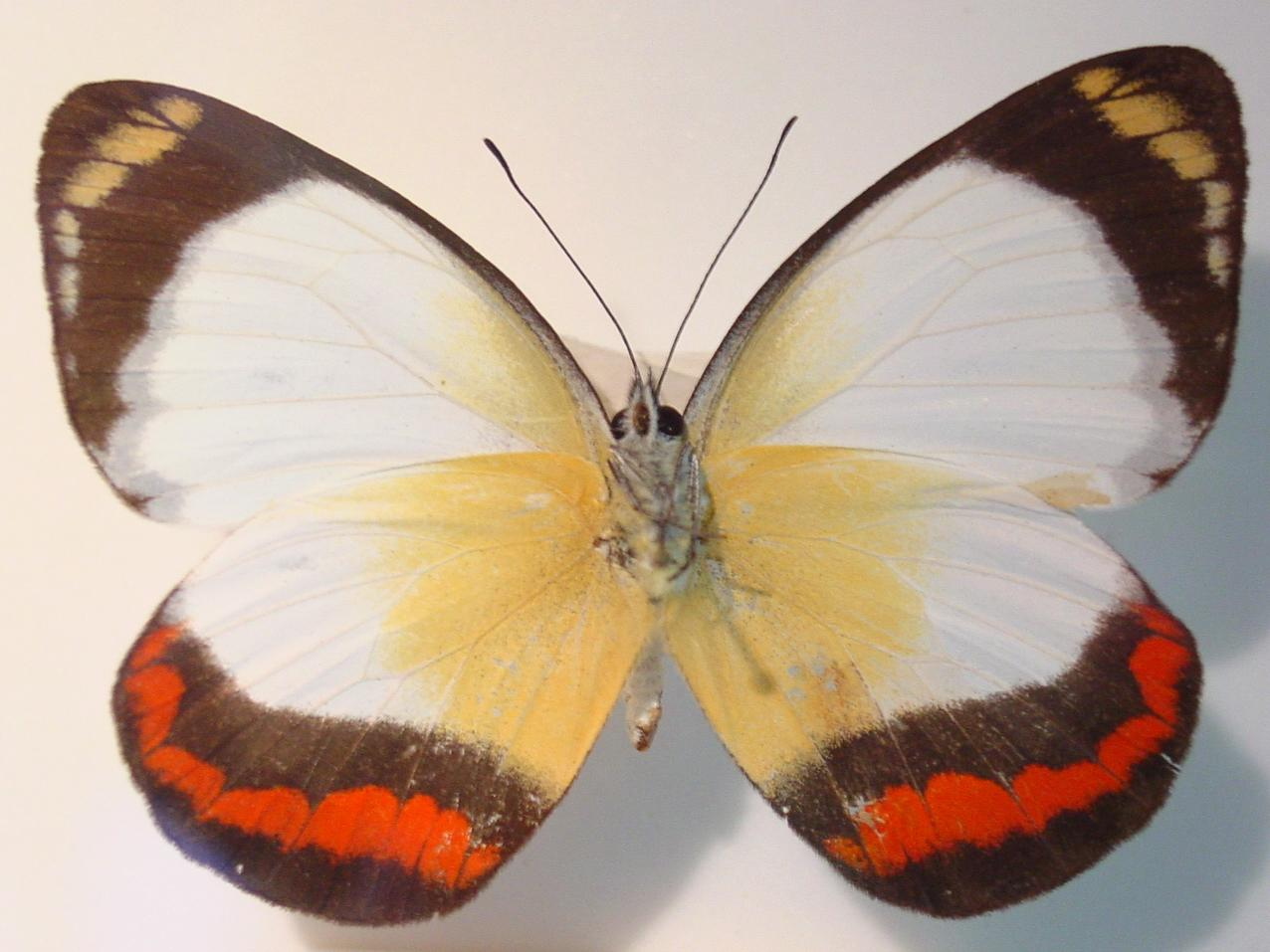
Red-banded Jezebel

family: Pieridae (whites and yellows) – 35+2+1 species [†1 introduced species]

=== Pierinae: whites ===
subfamily: Pierinae (whites)

tribe: Elodinini

genus: Elodina (pearl-whites)
- Southern pearl-white, Elodina angulipennis (H. Lucas, 1852)
- Cape York pearl-white, Elodina claudia (de Baar & Hancock, 1993)
- Narrow-winged pearl-white, Elodina padusa (Hewitson, 1853)
- Striated pearl-white, Elodina parthia (Hewitson, 1853)
- Delicate pearl-white, Elodina perdita (Miskin, 1889)
- Glistening pearl-white, Elodina queenslandica (de Baar & Hancock, 1993)
- Small pearl-white, Elodina walkeri (Butler, 1898)

tribe: Leptosiaini

genus: Leptosia
- Black-spotted white, Leptosia nina (Fabricius, 1793) – pictured right

tribe: Pierini

genus: Appias (albatrosses)
- Orange albatross, Appias ada (Waterhouse & Lyell, 1914)

A. a. caria (Waterhouse & Lyell, 1914)

- White or common albatross, Appias albina (Boisduval, 1836) – pictured right

A. a. albina (Boisduval, 1836)

- Blue albatross, Appias celestina (Boisduval, 1832)
- Grey albatross, Appias melania (Fabricius, 1775)
- Yellow albatross, Appias paulina (Cramer, 1777)

A. p. ega (Boisduval, 1836)

- Striped albatross, Appias olferna (Swinhoe, 1890)
genus: Pieris
- †Small cabbage white, Pieris rapae (Linnaeus, 1758) [†introduced species] – pictured right
genus: Belenois (formerly Anaphaeis)
- Caper white, Belenois java – pictured right

B. j. peristhene (Boisduval, 1859)
B. j. teutonia (Fabricius, 1775)

genus: Cepora
- Caper gull, Cepora perimale (Donovan, 1805)

C. p. scyllara (W. S. Macleay, 1826)

genus: Delias (Jezebels)
- Spotted Jezebel, Delias aganippe (Donovan, 1805)
- Scarlet Jezebel, Delias argenthona (Fabricius, 1793) – pictured right

D. a. argenthona (Fabricius, 1793)

- Golden Jezebel, Delias aruna (Boisduval, 1832)

D. a. inferna (Butler, 1871)

- Yellow-banded Jezebel, Delias ennia (Wallace, 1867)

D. e. nigidius (Miskin, 1884)
D. e. tindalii (Joicey & Talbot, 1926)

- Imperial Jezebel, Delias harpalyce (Donovan, 1805)
- Red-banded Jezebel, Delias mysis (Fabricius, 1775) – pictured right

D. m. mysis (Fabricius, 1775)
D. m. aestiva (Butler, 1897)
D. m. onca (Fruhstorfer, 1910)

- Black Jezebel, Delias nigrina (Fabricius, 1775)
- Yellow-spotted Jezebel, Delias nysa (Fabricius, 1775)

D. n. nysa (Fabricius, 1775)
D. n. nivira (Waterhouse & Lyell, 1914)

=== Coliadinae: yellows ===
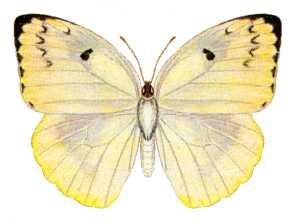
Lemon migrant

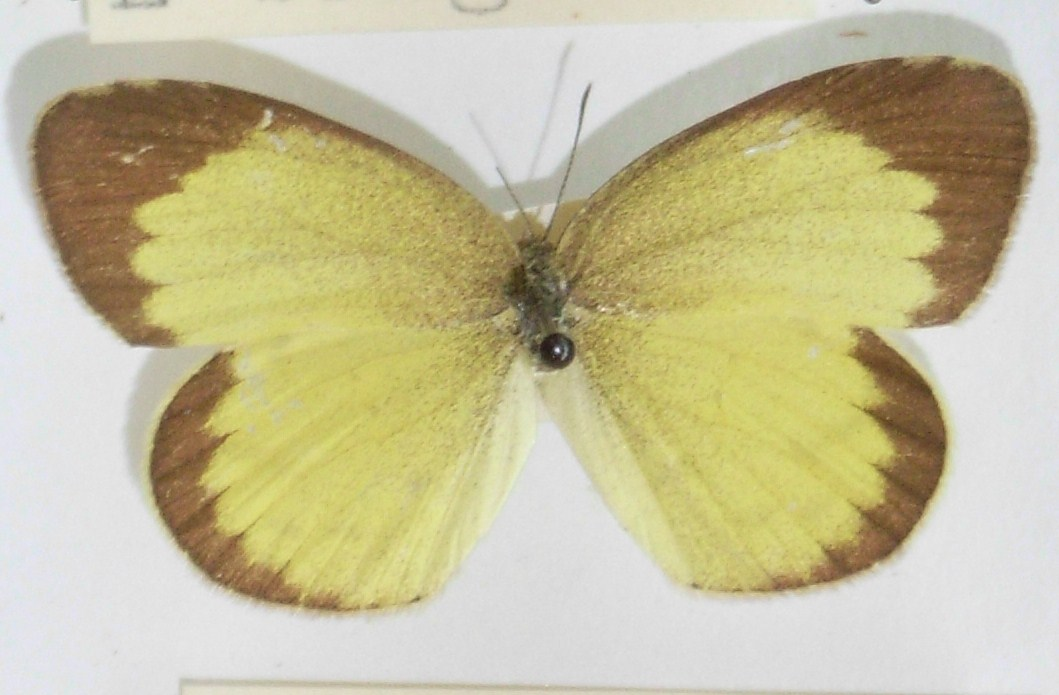
No-brand grass-yellow

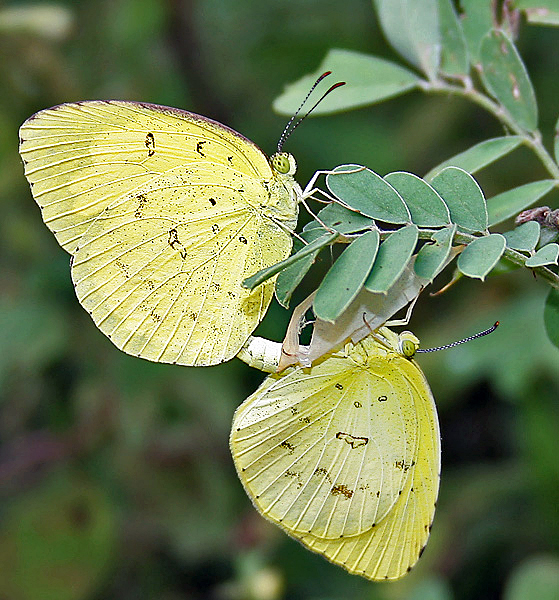
Large grass-yellow

subfamily: Coliadinae (yellows)

genus: Catopsilia (migrants or emigrants)
- White migrant, Catopsilia pyranthe (Linnaeus, 1758)

C. p. crokera (W. S. Macleay, 1826)

- Lemon migrant, Catopsilia pomona (Fabricius, 1775) – pictured right
- Orange migrant, Catopsilia scylla (Linnaeus, 1764)

C. s. etesia (Hewitson, 1867)

- Yellow migrant, Catopsilia gorgophone (Boisduval, 1836)

C. g. gorgophone (Boisduval, 1836)

genus: Eurema (grass-yellows)
- No-brand grass-yellow, Eurema brigitta (Stoll, 1780) – pictured right

E. b. australis (Wallace, 1867)
E. b. zoraide (C. & R. Felder, 1865)

- Lined grass-yellow, Eurema laeta (Boisduval, 1836)

E. l. sana (Butler, 1877)

- Pink grass-yellow, Eurema herla (W. S. Macleay, 1826)
- Small grass-yellow, Eurema smilax (Donovan, 1805)

E. s. smilax (Donovan, 1805)

- Broad-margined grass-yellow, Eurema puella (Boisduval, 1832)

E. p. papuan (Butler, 1898)
E. p. virgo (Wallace, 1867)

- Scalloped grass-yellow, Eurema alitha (C. & R. Felder, 1832)
- Large grass-yellow, Eurema hecabe (Linnaeus, 1758) – pictured right

E. h. hecabe (Linnaeus, 1758)
E. h. phoebus (Butler, 1886)

- *Three-spot grass yellow, Eurema blanda (Boisduval, 1836) [*native to Christmas and Darnley Islands]

== Riodinidae: metalmarks ==
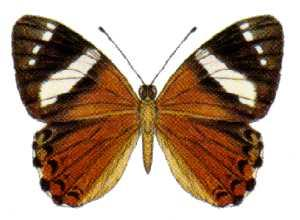
Harlequin metalmark

family: Riodinidae (metalmarks) – 1 species

=== Nemeobiinae ===
subfamily: Nemeobiinae

genus: Praetaxila
- Harlequin metalmark, Praetaxila segecia (Hewitson, 1861) – pictured right

P. s. punctaria (Fruhstorfer, 1914)

== Lycaenidae: gossamer-winged blues and coppers ==
family: Lycaenidae (gossamer-winged blues and coppers) – 142+7 species

=== Miletinae: harvesters ===
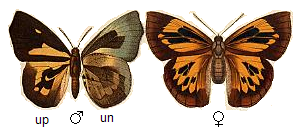
Moth butterfly

subfamily: Miletinae (harvesters)

tribe: Liphyrini

genus: Liphyra
- Moth butterfly, Liphyra brassolis (Westwood, 1864) – pictured right

L. b. major (Rothschild, 1898)

=== Theclinae: hairstreaks ===
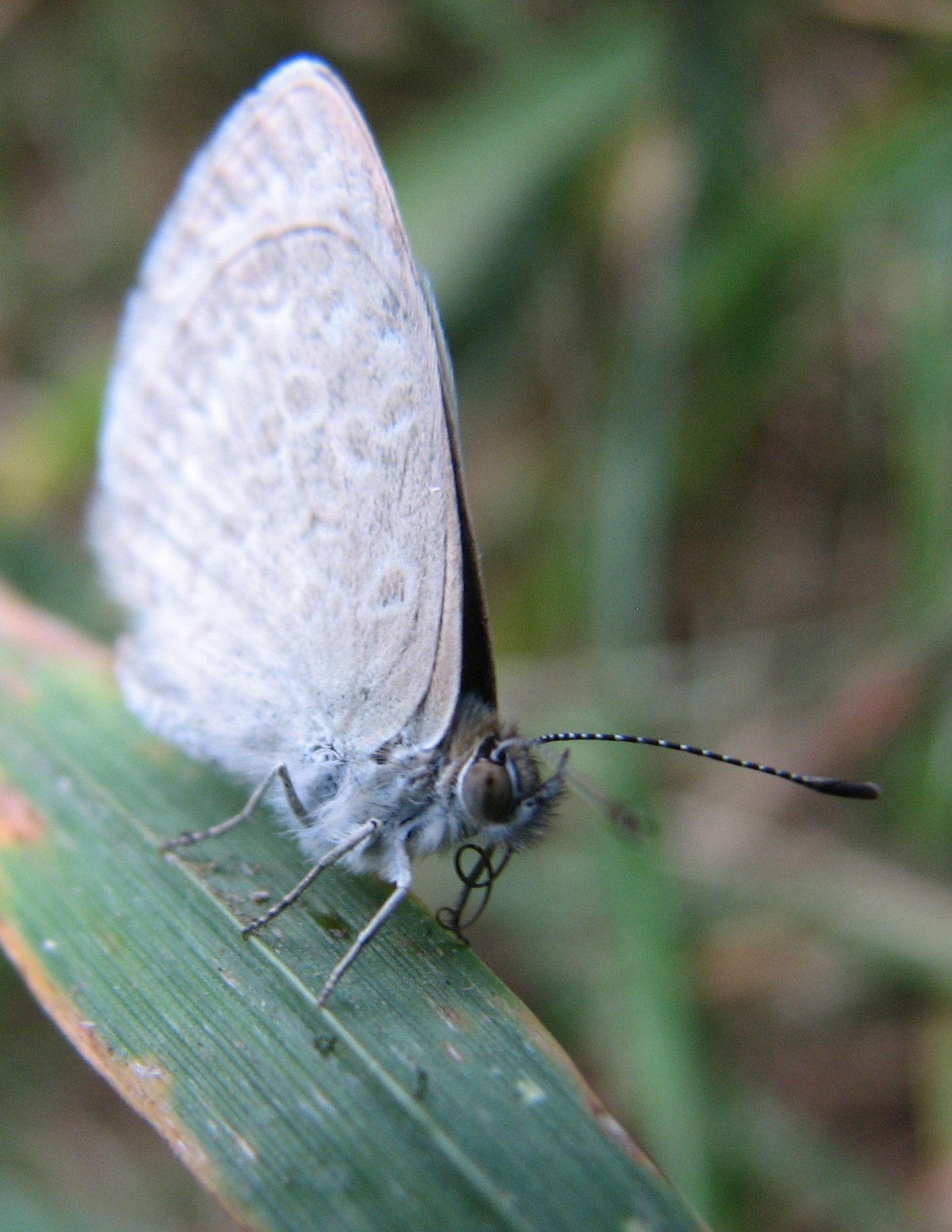
Purple copper

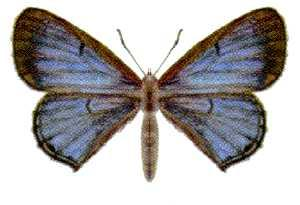
Illidge's ant blue

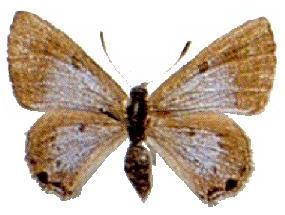
Grey ant-blue

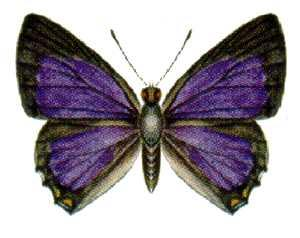
Yellow jewel

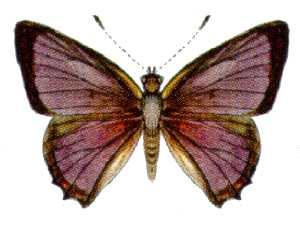
Mangrove jewel

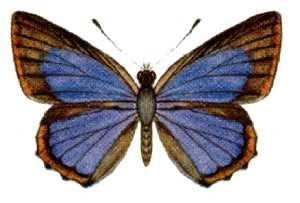
Turquoise jewel

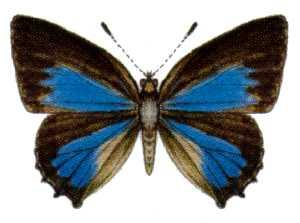
Narcissus jewel

subfamily: Theclinae (hairstreaks)

tribe: Luciini

genus: Lucia
- Chequered copper, Lucia limbaria (Swainson, 1833)
genus: Paralucia
- Bright copper, Paralucia aurifera (Blanchard, 1848)
- Fiery copper, Paralucia pyrodiscus (Doubleday, 1847)

P. p. lucida (Crosby, 1951)

- Purple or Bathurst copper, Paralucia spinifera (Edwards & Common, 1978) – pictured right
genus: Pseudodipsas
- Bright forest-blue, Pseudodipsas cephenes (Hewitson, 1874)
- Dark forest-blue, Pseudodipsas eone (C. & R. Felder, 1865)

P. e. iole (Waterhouse & Lyell, 1914)

genus: Acrodipsas (ant-blues)
- Black-veined ant-blue, Acrodipsas arcana (Miller & Edwards, 1978)
- Golden ant-blue, Acrodipsas aurata (Sands, 1997)
- Bronze ant-blue, Acrodipsas brisbanensis (Miskin, 1884)
- Copper ant-blue, Acrodipsas cuprea (Sands, 1965)
- Decima ant-blue, Acrodipsas decima Miller and Lane, 2004
- Black ant-blue, Acrodipsas hirtipes (Sands, 1980)
- Mangrove or Illidge's ant-blue, Acrodipsas illidgei (Waterhouse & Lyell, 1914) – pictured right
- Grey ant-blue, Acrodipsas melania (Sands, 1980) – pictured right
- Brown ant-blue, Acrodipsas mortoni (Sands, Miller & Kerr, 1997)
- Small ant-blue, Acrodipsas myrmecophila (Waterhouse & Lyell, 1913)
genus: Hypochrysops (jewels)
- Copper jewel, Hypochrysops apelles (Fabricius, 1775)

H. a. apelles (Fabricius, 1775)

- Apollo jewel, Hypochrysops apollo (Miskin, 1891)

H. a. apollo (Miskin, 1891)
H. a. phoebus (Waterhouse, 1928)

- Yellow jewel, Hypochrysops byzos (Boisduval, 1832) – pictured right
- Splendid jewel, Hypochrysops cleon (Grose-Smith, 1900)
- Cyane jewel, Hypochrysops cyane (Waterhouse & Lyell, 1914)
- Moonlight jewel, Hypochrysops delicia (Hewitson, 1875)

H. d. delicia (Hewitson, 1875)
H. d. duaringae (Waterhouse, 1903)

- Silky jewel, Hypochrysops digglesii (Hewitson, 1874)
- Amethyst jewel, Hypochrysops elgneri (Waterhouse & Lyell, 1909)

H. e. elgneri (Waterhouse & Lyell, 1909)
H. e. barnardi (Waterhouse, 1934)

- Mangrove jewel, Hypochrysops epicurus (Miskin, 1876) – pictured right
- Turquoise jewel, Hypochrysops halyaetus (Hewitson, 1874) – pictured right
- Paradise jewel, Hypochrysops hippuris (Hewitson, 1874)

H. h. nebulosis (Sands, 1986)

- Fiery jewel, Hypochrysops ignita (Leach, 1814)

H. i. ignita (Leach, 1814)
H. i. chrysonotus (Grose-Smith, 1899)
H. i. erythina (Waterhouse & Lyell, 1914)
H. i. oliffi (Miskin, 1889)

- Coral jewel, Hypochrysops miskini (Waterhouse, 1903)

H. m. miskini (Waterhouse, 1903)

- Narcissus jewel, Hypochrysops narcissus (Fabricius, 1775) – pictured right

H. n. narcissus (Fabricius, 1775)
H. n. sabirus (Fruhstorfer, 1908)

- Bulloak jewel, Hypochrysops piceata (Kerr, Macqueen & Sands, 1969)
- Royal jewel, Hypochrysops polycletus (Linnaeus, 1758)

H. p. rovena (Druce, 1891)

- Peacock jewel, Hypochrysops pythias (C. & R. Felder, 1865)

H. p. euclides (Miskin, 1889)

- Green-banded jewel, Hypochrysops theon (C. & R. Felder, 1865)

H. t. medocus (Fruhstorfer, 1908)
H. t. cretatus (Sands, 1986)

genus: Philiris (moonbeams)
- Azure moonbeam, Philiris azule (Wind & Clench, 1947)
- Large moonbeam, Philiris diana (Waterhouse & Lyell, 1914)

P. d. diana (Waterhouse & Lyell, 1914)
P. d. papuanus (Wind & Clench, 1947)

- Bicolour moonbeam, Philiris fulgens (Grose, Smith & Kirby, 1897)

P. f. kurandae (Waterhouse, 1903)

- Purple moonbeam, Philiris innotatus (Miskin, 1874)
- Blue moonbeam, Philiris nitens (Grose-Smith, 1898)

P. n. nitens (Grose-Smith, 1898)
P. n. lucina (Waterhouse & Lyell, 1914)

- Sapphire moonbeam, Philiris sappheira (Sands, 1980)
- White-margined moonbeam, Philiris ziska (Grose-Smith, 1898)

tribe: Arhopalini

genus: Arhopala (oak-blues)
- Arhopala eupolis (Miskin, 1890)
- Bright oak-blue, Arhopala madytus (Fruhstorfer, 1914)
- Shining oak-blue, Arhopala micale (Blanchard, 1848)

A. m. amphis (Waterhouse, 1942)

- White oak-blue, Arhopala wildei (Miskin, 1891)

A. w. wildei (Miskin, 1891)

tribe: Ogyrini

genus: Ogyris (azures)
- Dark purple azure, Ogyris abrota (Westwood, 1851)
- Sapphire azure, Ogyris aenone (Waterhouse, 1902)
- Satin azure, Ogyris amaryllis (Hewitson, 1862)
- Bright purple azure, Ogyris barnardi (Miskin, 1890)
- Southern purple azure, Ogyris genoveva (Hewitson, 1853)
- Golden azure, Ogyris ianthis (Waterhouse, 1900)
- Large bronze azure, Ogyris idmo (Hewitson, 1862)
- Orange-tipped azure, Ogyris iphis (Waterhouse & Lyell, 1914)
- Broad-margined azure, Ogyris olane (Hewitson, 1862)
- Silky azure, Ogyris oroetes (Hewitson, 1862)
- Small bronze azure, Ogyris otanes (C. & R. Felder, 1865)
- Arid bronze azure, Ogyris subterrestris (Field, 1999)
- Northern purple azure, Ogyris zosine (Hewitson, 1853)

tribe: Zesiini (hairstreaks)

genus: Jalmenus
- Inland hairstreak, Jalmenus aridus (Graham & Moulds, 1988)
- Turquoise hairstreak, Jalmenus clementi (Druce, 1902)
- Emerald hairstreak, Jalmenus daemeli (Semper, 1879)
- Northern hairstreak, Jalmenus eichhorni (Staudinger, 1888)
- Imperial hairstreak, Jalmenus evagoras (Donovan, 1805)
- Amethyst hairstreak, Jalmenus icilius (Hewitson, 1865)
- Jalmenus eubulus Miskin, 1876
- Stencilled hairstreak, Jalmenus ictinus (Hewitson, 1865)
- Varied hairstreak, Jalmenus inous (Hewitson, 1865)

J. i. inous (Hewitson, 1865)
J. i. notocrucifer (Johnson, Hay & Bollam, 1992)

- Waterhouse's hairstreak, Jalmenus lithochroa (Waterhouse, 1903)
- Macqueen's hairstreak, Jalmenus pseudictinus (Kerr & Macqueen, 1967)
genus: Pseudalmenus
- Silky hairstreak, Pseudalmenus chlorinda (Blanchard, 1948)

P. c. chlorinda (Blanchard, 1948)
P. c. conara (Couchman, 1965)
P. c. zephyrus (Waterhouse & Lyell, 1914)
P. c. myrsilus (Westwood, 1851)
P. c. chloris (Waterhouse & Lyell, 1914)
P. c. barringtonensis (Waterhouse, 1928)

tribe: Hypolycaenini

genus: Hypolycaena
- Orchid flash, Hypolycaena danis (C. & R. Felder, 1865)

H. d. turneri (Waterhouse, 1903)

- Black-spotted flash, Hypolycaena phorbas (Fabricius, 1793)

H. p. phorbas (Fabricius, 1793)
H. p. ingura (Tindale, 1923)

tribe: Deudorigini

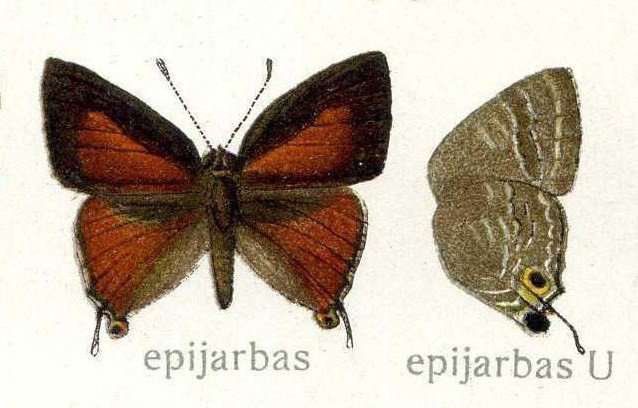
Dark cornelian

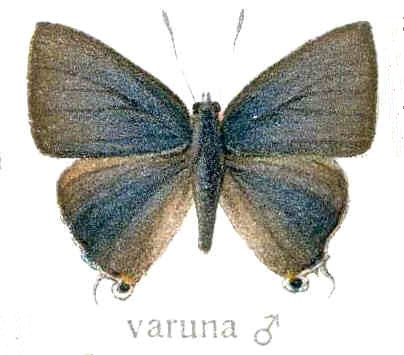
Indigo flash

genus: Deudorix
- Dark cornelian, Deudorix epijarbas (Moore, 1858) – pictured right

D. e. dido (Waterhouse, 1934)
D. e. diovis (Hewitson, 1863)

- Bright cornelian, Deudorix diovis (Hewitson, 1863)
- Orange-lobed flash, Deudorix epirus (C. Felder, 1860)

D. e. agimar (Fruhstorfer, 1908)

- White-spotted flash, Deudorix democles (Miskin, 1884)

D. d. democles (Miskin, 1884)

- Princess flash, Deudorix smilis (Hewitson, 1863)

D. s. dalyensis (le Souëf & Tindale, 1970)

genus: Rapala
- Indigo flash, Rapala varuna (Horsfield, 1829) – pictured right

R. v. simsoni (Miskin, 1874)

genus: Bindahara
- Sword-tailed flash, Bindahara phocides (Fabricius, 1793)

B. p. yurgama (Couchman, 1965)

=== Polyommatinae: blues ===
subfamily: Polyommatinae (blues)

tribe: Candalidini

genus: Candalides (pencil– and dusky-blues)
- Shining pencil-blue, Candalides helenita (Semper, 1879)

C. h. helenita (Semper, 1879)

- Trident pencil-blue, Candalides margarita (Semper, 1879)

C. m. margarita (Semper, 1879)

- Northern pencil-blue, Candalides gilberti (Waterhouse, 1903)
- Common pencil-blue, Candalides absimilis (C. Felder, 1862)
- Dark pencil-blue, Candalides consimilis (Waterhouse, 1942)

C. c. consimilis (Waterhouse, 1942)
C. c. goodingi (Tindale, 1965)
C. c. toza (Kerr, 1967)

- Copper pencil-blue, Candalides cyprotus (Olliff, 1886)

C. c. cyprotus (Olliff, 1886)
C. c. pallescens (Tite, 1963)

- Varied dusky-blue, Candalides hyacinthina (Semper, 1879)

C. h. hyacinthina (Semper, 1879)
C. h. simplexa (Tepper, 1882)
C. h. gilesi (Williams & Bollam, 2001)

- Twin dusky-blue, Candalides geminus (Edwards & Kerr, 1978)
- Small dusky-blue, Candalides erinus (Fabricius, 1775)

C. e. erinus (Fabricius, 1775)

- Blotched dusky-blue, Candalides acasta (Cox, 1873)
- Spotted dusky-blue, Candalides delospila (Waterhouse, 1903)
- Yellow-spotted blue, Candalides xanthospilos (Hübner, 1817)
- Rayed blue, Candalides heathi (Cox, 1873)

C. h. heathi (Cox, 1873)
C. h. alpina (Waterhouse, 1928)
C. h. doddi (Burns, 1948)

- Golden-rayed blue, Candalides noelkeri (Braby & Douglas, 2004)
genus: Nesolycaena (opals)
- Dark opal, Nesolycaena medicia (Miskin, 1891)
- Satin opal, Nesolycaena albosericea (Braby, 1996)
- Spotted opal, Nesolycaena urumelia (Tindale, 1922)
- Kimberley spotted opal, Nesolycaena caesia (d'Apice & Miller, 1992)

tribe: Lycaenestheni

genus: Anthene (ciliate-blues)
- Dark ciliate-blue, Anthene seltuttus (Röber, 1886)

A. s. affinis (Waterhouse & RE Turner, 1905)

- Pale ciliate-blue, Anthene lycaenoides (C. Felder, 1860)

A. l. godeffroyi (Semper, 1879)

tribe: Polyommatini

genus: Petrelaea
- Mauve line-blue, Petrelaea tombugensis (Röber, 1886)
genus: Nacaduba
- Large purple line-blue, Nacaduba berenice (Herrich-Schäffer, 1869)

N. b. berenice (Herrich-Schäffer, 1869)

- White-banded line-blue, Nacaduba kurava (Moore, 1858)

N. k. parma (Waterhouse & Lyell, 1914)
N. k. felsina (Waterhouse & Lyell, 1914)

- Two-spotted line-blue, Nacaduba biocellata (C. & R. Felder, 1865)

N. b. biocellata (C. & R. Felder, 1865)

- Green-banded line-blue, Nacaduba cyanea (Cramer, 1775)
- *Violet line-blue, Nacaduba calauria (C. Felder, 1860) [*native to Dauan and Murray Islands]

N. c. calauria (C. Felder, 1860)

- *Bold line-blue, Nacaduba pactolus (C. Felder, 1860) [*native to Darnley and Murray Islands]
genus: Erysichton
- Hairy line-blue, Erysichton lineata (Murray, 1874)

E. l. lineata (Murray, 1874)

- Marbled line-blue, Erysichton palmyra (C. Felder, 1860)

E. p. tasmanicus (Miskin, 1890)

genus: Danis
- Large green-banded blue, Danis danis (Cramer, 1775)

D. d. serapis (Miskin, 1891)
D. d. syrius (Miskin, 1890)

genus: Nothodanis
- *Dark green-banded blue, Nothodanis schaeffera (Eschscholtz, 1821) [*native to Murray Island]
genus: Psychonotis
- Small green-banded blue, Psychonotis caelius (C. Felder, 1860) – query this one

P. c. taygetus (C. & R. Felder, 1865)

genus: Prosotas
- Purple line-blue, Prosotas dubiosa (Semper, 1879)

P. d. dubiosa (Semper, 1879)

- Short-tailed line-blue, Prosotas felderi (Murray, 1874)
- Long-tailed line-blue, Prosotas nora (Waterhouse & Lyell, 1914)

P. n. auletes (Waterhouse & Lyell, 1914)

- *Gracile line-blue, Prosotas gracilis (Röber, 1886) [*native to Dauan Island]
genus: Catopyrops
- Papuan line-blue, Catopyrops ancyra (Waterhouse & Lyell, 1914)

C. a. mysia (Waterhouse & Lyell, 1914)

- Speckled line-blue, Catopyrops florinda (Butler, 1877)

C. f. halys (Waterhouse, 1934)
C. f. estrella (Waterhouse & Lyell, 1914)

genus: Ionolyce
- Bronze line-blue, Ionolyce helicon (Waterhouse & Lyell, 1914)

I. h. hyllus (Waterhouse & Lyell, 1914)

genus: Theclinesthes
- Bitter-bush blue, Theclinesthes albocincta (Waterhouse, 1903)
- Western bitter-bush blue, Theclinesthes hesperia (Sibatani & Grund, 1978)

T. h. hesperia (Sibatani & Grund, 1978)
T. h. littoralis (Sibatani & Grund, 1978)

- Wattle blue, Theclinesthes miskini (T. P. Lucas, 1889)

T. m. miskini (T. P. Lucas, 1889)
T. m. eucalypti (Sibatani & Grund, 1978)
T. m. arnoldi (Fruhstorfer, 1916)

- Cycad blue, Theclinesthes onycha (Hewitson, 1865)

T. o. onycha (Hewitson, 1865)
T. o. capricornia (Sibatani & Grund, 1978)

- Saltbush blue, Theclinesthes serpentata (Herrich-Schäffer, 1869)

T. s. serpentata (Herrich-Schäffer, 1869)
T. s. lavara (Couchman, 1954)

- Samphire blue, Theclinesthes sulpitius (Miskin, 1890)
genus: Sahulana
- Glistening line-blue, Sahulana scintillata (T. P. Lucas, 1889)
genus: Neolucia (heath-blues)
- Fringed heath-blue, Neolucia agricola (Westwood, 1851)

N. a. agricola (Westwood, 1851)
N. a. insulana (Waterhouse & Lyell, 1914)
N. a. occidens (Waterhouse & Lyell, 1914)

- Montane heath-blue, Neolucia hobartensis (Miskin, 1890)

N. h. hobartensis (Miskin, 1890)
N. h. monticola (Waterhouse & Lyell, 1914)

- Dull heath-blue, Neolucia mathewi (Miskin, 1890)
genus: Jamides (ceruleans)
- White-banded cerulean, Jamides aleuas (C. & R. Felder, 1865)

J. a. coelestis (Miskin, 1891)

- Shining cerulean, Jamides amarauge (Druce, 1891)
- *King cerulean, Jamides bochus (Stoll, 1782) [*native to Christmas Island]
- *Papuan cerulean, Jamides nemophila (Butler, 1876) [*native to Darnley Island]
- Pale cerulean, Jamides cyta (Boisduval, 1832)

J. c. claudia (Waterhouse & Lyell, 1914)

- Purple cerulean, Jamides phaseli (Mathew, 1889)
genus: Catochrysops (pea-blues)
- Cobalt pea-blue, Catochrysops amasea (Waterhouse & Lyell, 1914)

C. a. amasea (Waterhouse & Lyell, 1914)

- Pale pea-blue, Catochrysops panormus (C. Felder, 1860)

C. p. platissa (Herrich-Schäffer, 1869)
C. p. papuana (Tite, 1959)

genus: Lampides
- Long-tailed pea-blue, Lampides boeticus (Linnaeus, 1767)
genus: Leptotes (synonyms Tarucus and Syntarucus)
- Plumbago blue, Leptotes plinius (Fabricius, 1793)

L. p. pseudocassius (Murray, 1873)

genus: Zizeeria
- Spotted grass-blue, Zizeeria karsandra (Moore, 1865)
genus: Zizina
- Common grass-blue, Zizina labradus (Godart, 1824)

Z. l. labradus (Godart, 1824)
Z. l. labdalon (Waterhouse & Lyell, 1914)

- *Lesser grass-blue, Zizina otis (Fabricius, 1787) [*native to Christmas Island]
genus: Famegana

Black-spotted grass-blue, Famegana alsulus (Herrich-Schäffer, 1869)
F. a. alsulus (Herrich-Schäffer, 1869)

genus: Zizula
- Dainty grass-blue, Zizula hylax (Fabricius, 1775)

Z. h. attenuata (T. P. Lucas, 1890)

genus: Everes
- Orange-tipped pea-blue, Everes lacturnus (Godart, 1824)

E. l. australis (Couchman, 1962)

genus: Pithecops
- Pied blue, Pithecops dionisius (Boisduval, 1832)

P. d. dionisius (Boisduval, 1832)

genus: Neopithecops
- Devil's blue, Neopithecops lucifer (Röber, 1886)

N. l. heria (Fruhstorfer, 1919)

genus: Megisba
- Small pied blue, Megisba strongyle (C. Felder, 1860)

M. s. nigra (Miskin, 1890)

genus: Udara
- Delicate blue, Udara tenella (Miskin, 1891)
genus: Euchrysops
- Spotted pea-blue, Euchrysops cnejus (Fabricius, 1798)

E. c. cnidus (Waterhouse & Lyell, 1914)

genus: Freyeria
- Jewelled grass-blue, Freyeria putli (Kollar, 1844)

F. p. putli (Kollar, 1844)

== Nymphalidae: brush– or four-footed ==
family: Nymphalidae (brush– or four-footed) – 81+6 species

=== Morphinae ===
subfamily: Morphinae

tribe: Amathusiini

genus Taenaris
- Pearl owl, Taenaris artemis (Snellen van Vollenhoven, 1860)

T. a. jamesi (Butler, 1876)

- *Silky owl, Taenaris catops (Westwood, 1851) [*native to Saibai and Darnley Islands]

=== Satyrinae ===
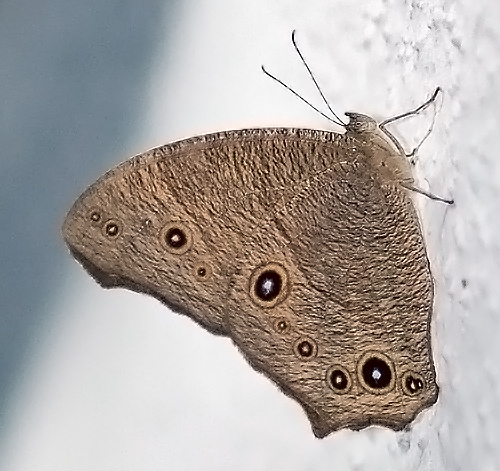
Evening brown

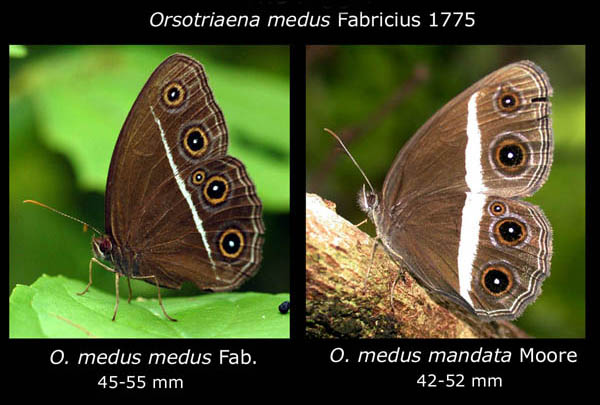
Dusky bush-brown

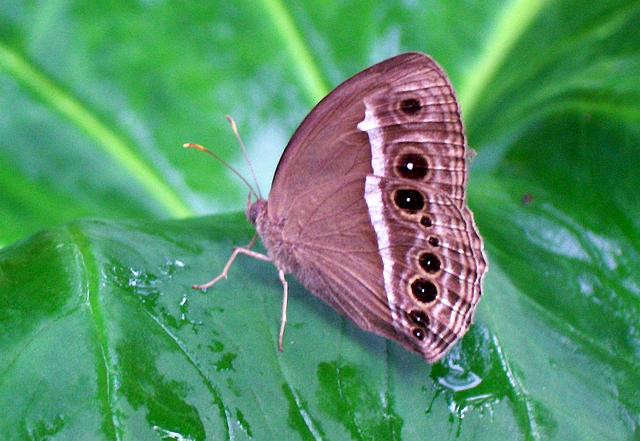
Dingy bush-brown

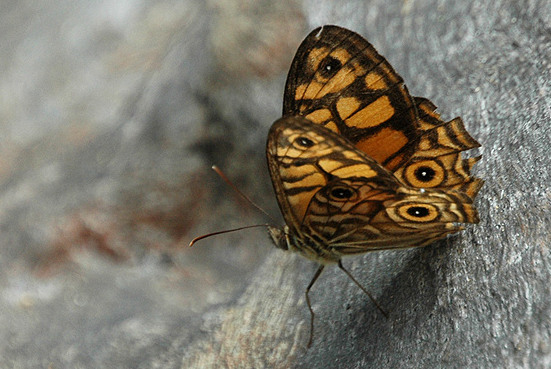
Ringed xenica

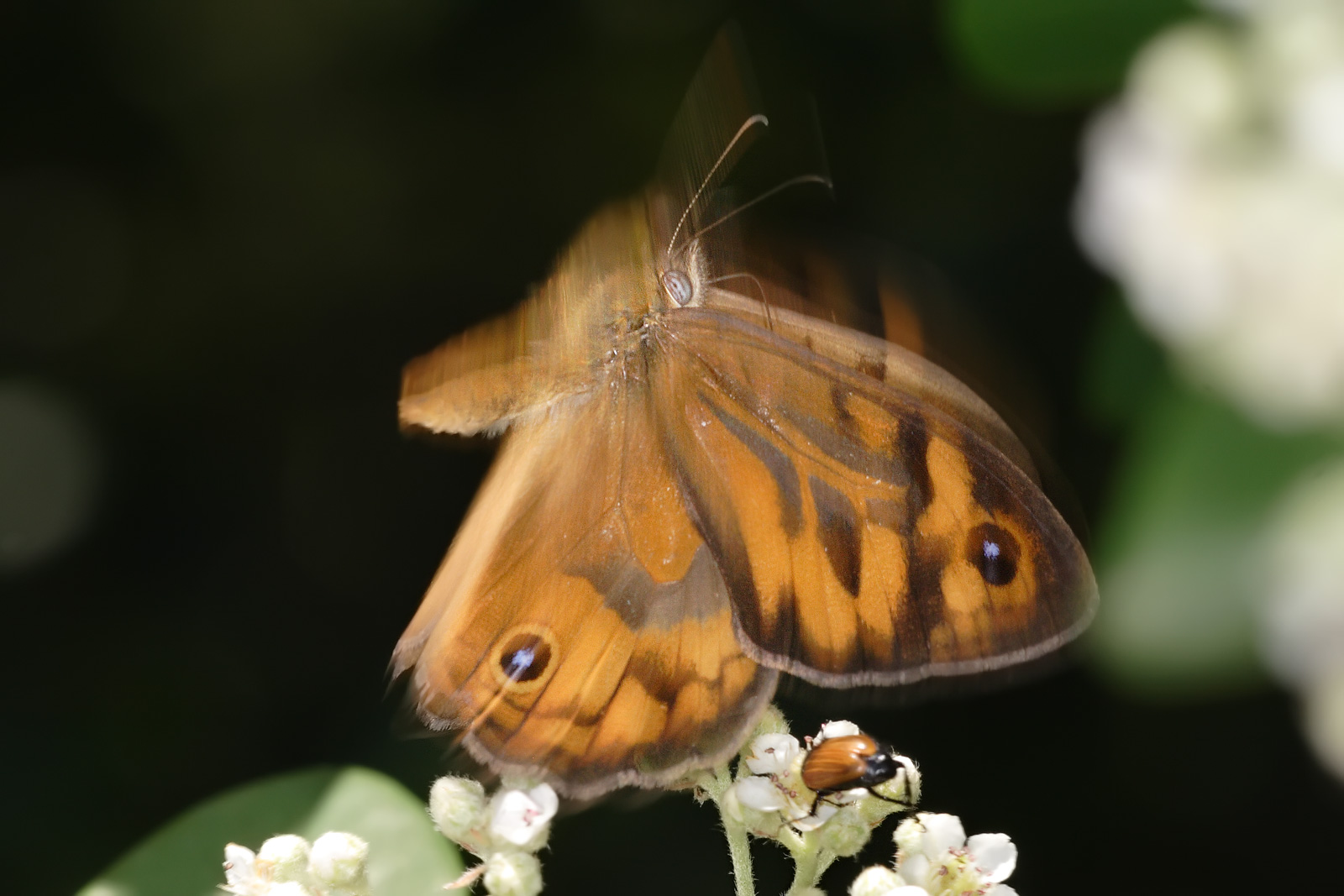
Common brown

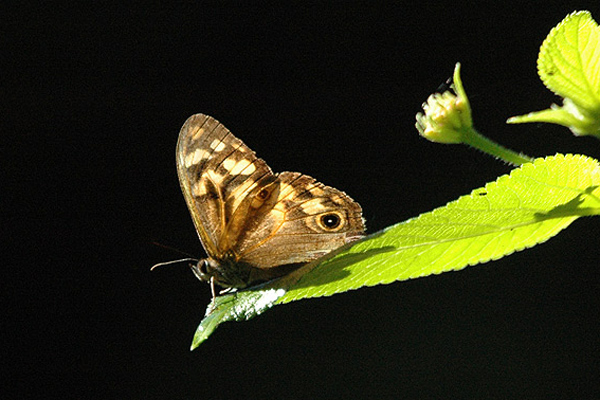
Banks' brown

subfamily: Satyrinae

tribe: Biini

subtribe: Melanititi

genus: Melanitis
- Evening brown, Melanitis leda (Linnaeus, 1758) – pictured right

M. l. bankia (Fabricius, 1775)

- *Banded evening brown, Melanitis amabilis (Boisduval, 1832) [*native to Darnley Island]
- *Papuan evening brown, Melanitis constantia (Cramer, 1777) [*native to Murray Island]

tribe: Elymniini

subtribe: Elymniiti

genus: Elymnias
- Palmfly, Elymnias agondas (Boisduval, 1832)

E. a. australiana (Fruhstorfer, 1900)

subtribe: Mycalesiti

- Dusky bush-brown, Orsotriaena medus (Fabricius, 1775) – pictured right

O. m. moira (Waterhouse & Lyell, 1914)

- Dingy bush-brown, Mycalesis perseus (Fabricius, 1775) – pictured right

M. p. perseus (Fabricius, 1775)

- Cedar bush-brown, Mycalesis sirius (Fabricius, 1775)

M. s. sirius (Fabricius, 1775)

- Orange bush-brown, Mycalesis terminus (Fabricius, 1775)

M. t. terminus (Fabricius, 1775)

tribe: Satyrini

subtribe: Ypthimiti

genus: Ypthima
- Dusky knight, Ypthima arctoa (Fabricius, 1775)

Y. a. arctoa (Fabricius, 1775)

subtribe: Hypocystiti

genus: Hypocysta
- Hypocysta adiante (Hübner, 1831)

H. a. angustata (Waterhouse & Lyell, 1914)

- Hypocysta euphemia (Westwood, 1851)
- Hypocysta irius (Fabricius, 1775)
- Hypocysta metirius (Butler, 1875)
- Hypocysta pseudirius (Butler, 1875)
genus: Nesoxenica – endemic to Tasmania
- Tasmanian xenica, Nesoxenica leprea (Hewitson, 1864)

N. l. leprea (Hewitson, 1864)
N. l. elia (Waterhouse & Lyell, 1914)

genus: Argynnina
- Argynnina cyrila (Waterhouse & Lyell, 1914)
- Argynnina hobartia (Westwood, 1851)
genus: Oreixenica
- Oreixenica correae (Olliff, 1890)
- Oreixenica kershawi (Miskin, 1876)
- Oreixenica lathoniella (Westwood, 1851)
- Oreixenica latialis (Waterhouse & Lyell, 1914)
- Oreixenica orichora (Meyrick, 1885)
- Oreixenica ptunarra (Couchman, 1953)
genus: Geitoneura
- Ringed xenica, Geitoneura acantha (Donovan, 1805) – pictured right
- Marbled xenica, Geitoneura klugii (Guérin-Méneville, 1830) – pictured right
- Geitoneura minyas (Waterhouse & Lyell, 1914)
genus: Heteronympha
- Banks' brown, Heteronympha banksii (Leach, 1814) – pictured right
- Heteronympha cordace (Geyer, 1832)
- Heteronympha merope (Fabricius, 1775)
- Heteronympha mirifica (Butler, 1866)
- Heteronympha paradelpha (Lower, 1893)
- Heteronympha penelope (Waterhouse, 1937)
- Heteronympha solandri (Waterhouse, 1904)
genus: Tisiphone
- Tisiphone abeona (Donovan, 1805)
- Tisiphone helena (Olliff, 1888)

=== Charaxinae: leafwings ===
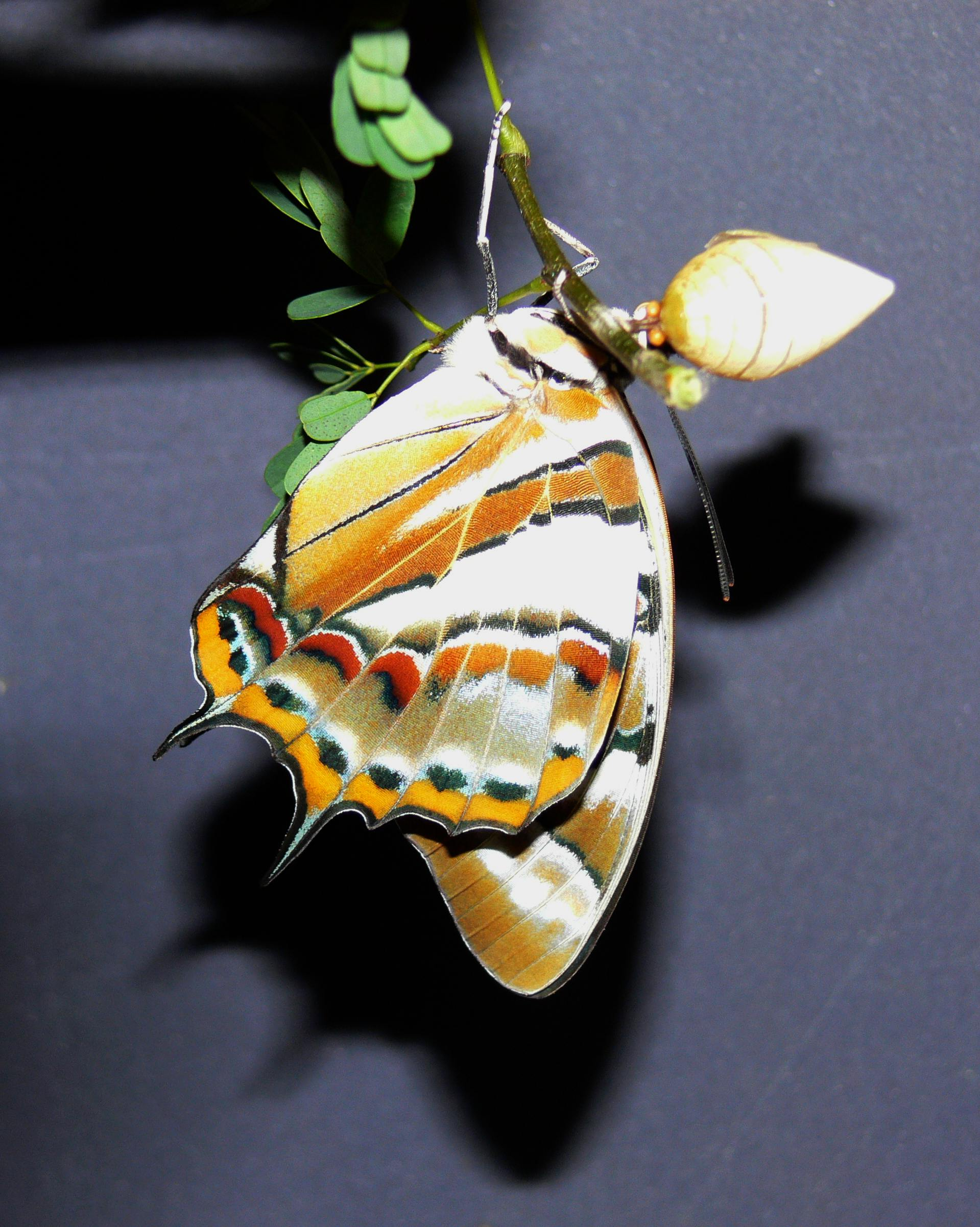
Tailed emperor

subfamily: Charaxinae (leafwings)

genus: Charaxes
- Orange emperor, Charaxes latona (Butler, 1865)
genus: Polyura
- Tailed emperor, Polyura sempronius (Fabricius, 1793) – pictured right

Polyura pyrrhus sempronius (Fabricius, 1793)

- *Christmas emperor, Polyura andrewsi (Butler, 1900) [*native to Christmas Island]

=== Apaturinae ===
subfamily: Apaturinae

genus: Apaturina
- Apaturina erminea (Cramer, 1779)

A. e. papuana (Ribbe, 1884)

=== Heliconiinae: longwings ===
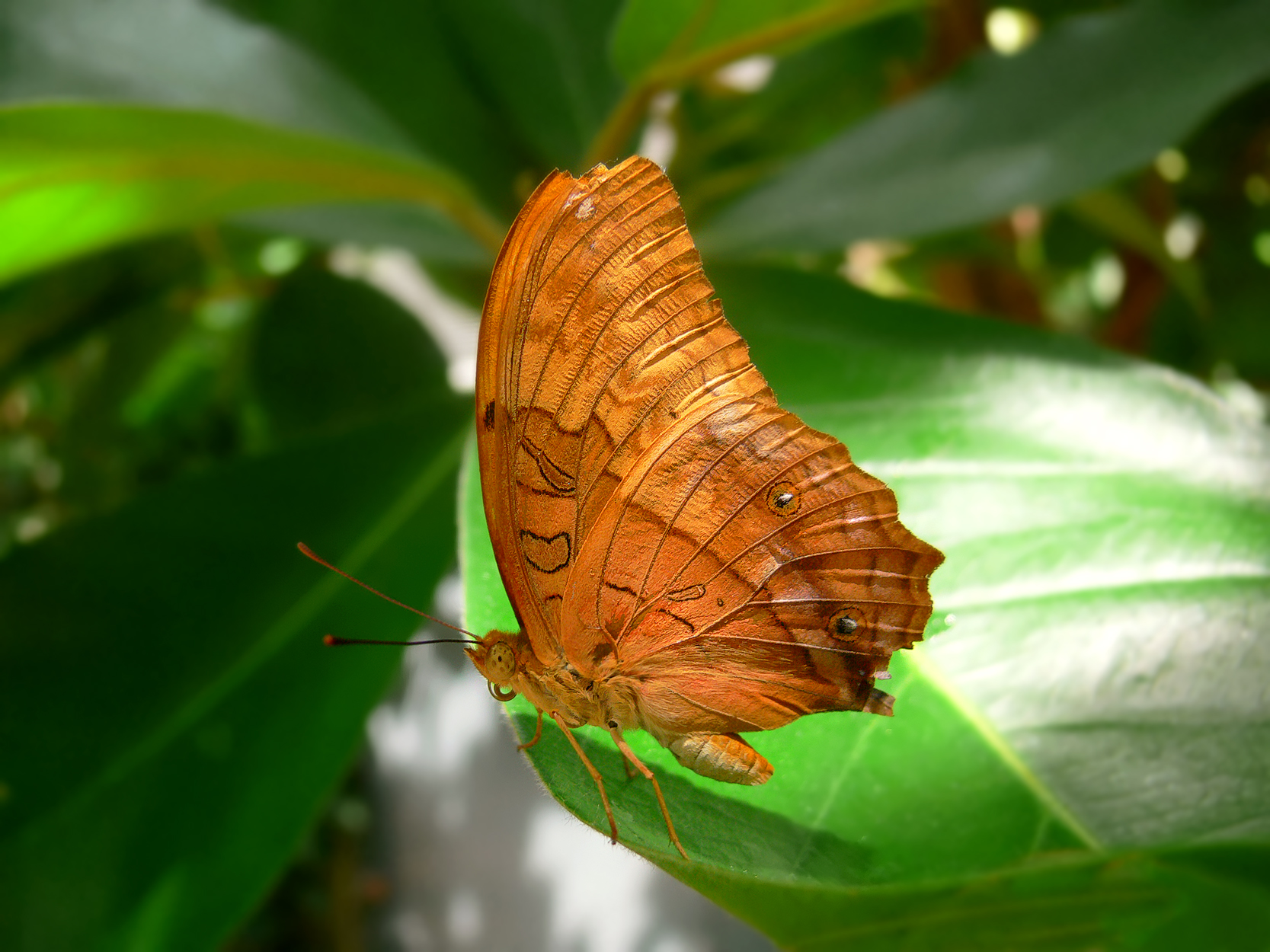
Cruiser

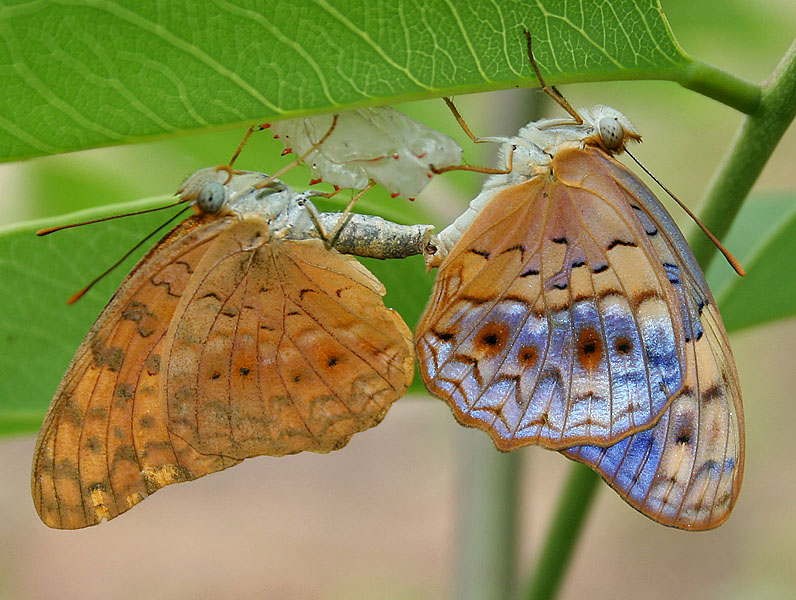
Spotted rustic

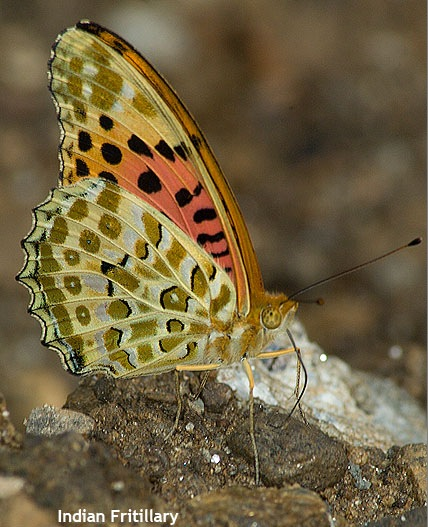
Laced fritillary

subfamily: Heliconiinae (longwings)

tribe: Acraeini

genus: Acraea
- Glasswing, Acraea andromacha (Fabricius, 1775)

A. a. andromacha (Fabricius, 1775)

tribe: Heliconiini

genus: Cethosia
- Red lacewing, Cethosia cydippe (Linnaeus, 1758)

C. c. chrysippe (Fabricius, 1775)

- Orange lacewing, Cethosia penthesilea (Cramer, 1777)

C. p. paksha (Fruhstorfer, 1905)

tribe: Vagrantini

genus: Vindula
- Cruiser, Vindula arsinoe (Cramer, 1777) – pictured right

V. a. ada (Butler, 1874)

genus: Cupha
- Bordered rustic, Cupha prosope (Fabricius, 1775)

C. p. prosope (Fabricius, 1775)

genus: Vagrans
- Tailed rustic, Vagrans egista (Cramer, 1780)

V. e. propinqua (Miskin, 1884)

genus: Phalanta
- Spotted rustic, Phalanta phalantha (Drury, 1773) – pictured right

P. p. araca (Waterhouse & Lyell, 1914)

tribe: Argynnini

genus: Argynnis
- Laced fritillary, Argynnis hyperbius (Linnaeus, 1763) – pictured right

A. h. inconstans Butler, 1873

=== Nymphalinae ===
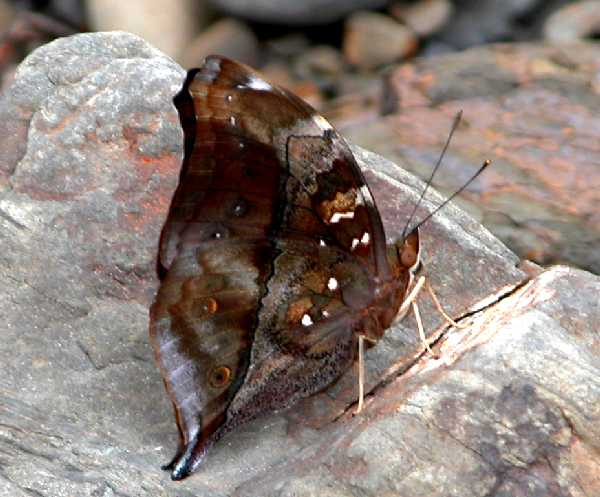
Leafwing

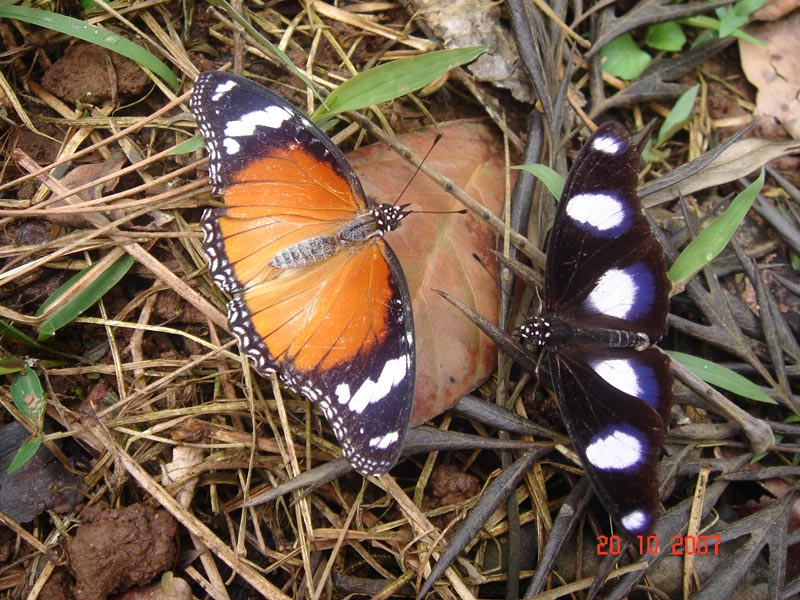
Danaid eggfly

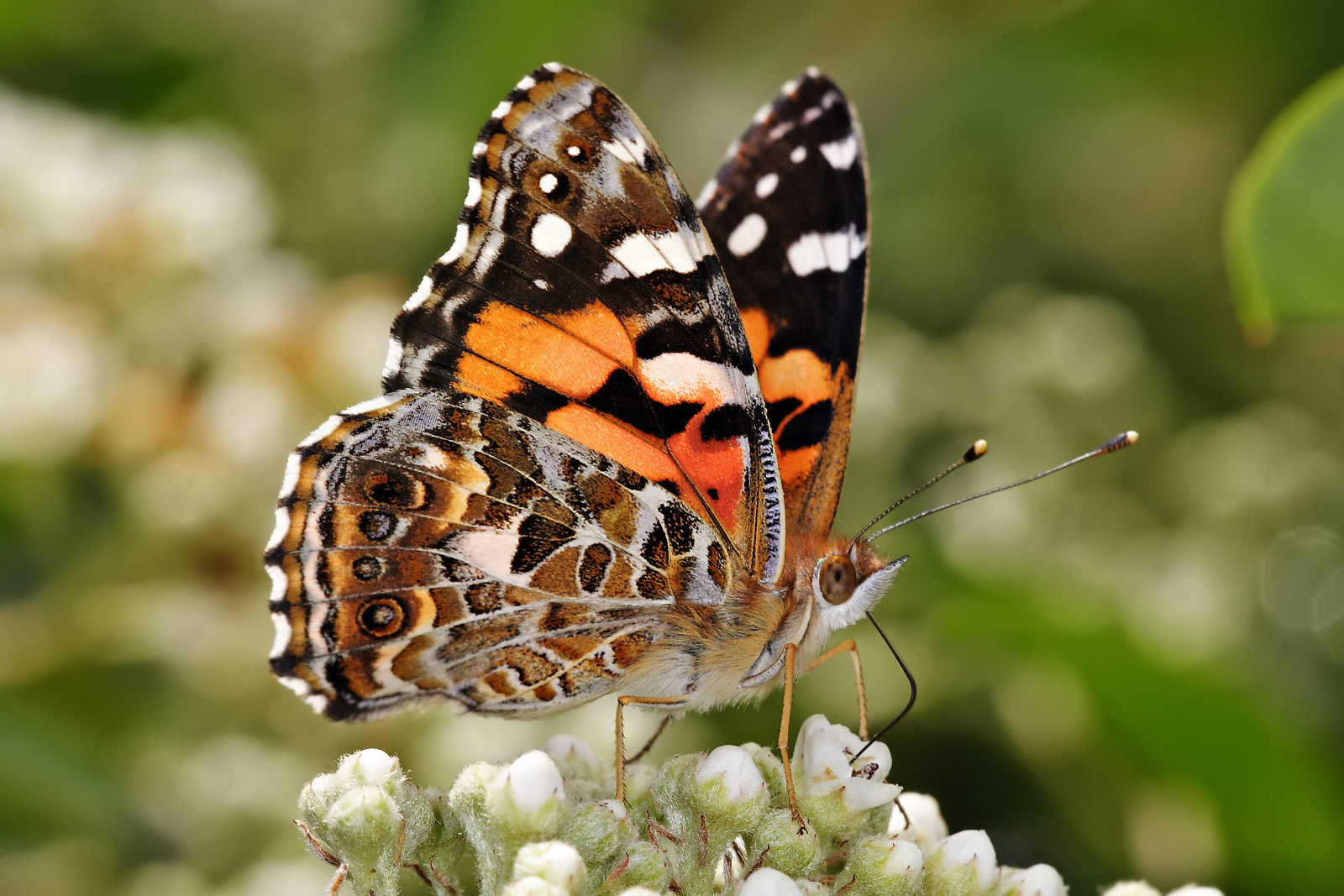
Australian painted lady

subfamily: Nymphalinae

genus: Doleschallia
- Leafwing, Doleschallia bisaltide (Cramer, 1777) – pictured right

D. b. australis (C. & R. Felder, 1867)

genus: Hypolimnas
- Blue-banded eggfly, Hypolimnas alimena (Linnaeus, 1758)

H. a. lamina (Fruhstorfer, 1903)
H. a. darwinensis (Waterhouse & Lyell, 1914)

- Crow eggfly, Hypolimnas anomala (Wallace, 1869)

H. a. albula (Wallace, 1869)

- *Spotted crow eggfly, Hypolimnas antilope (Cramer, 1777) [*native to Murray and Yorke Islands]
- Varied eggfly, Hypolimnas bolina (Linnaeus, 1758)

H. b. bolina (Linnaeus, 1758)
H. b. nerina (Fabricius, 1775)

- Danaid eggfly, Hypolimnas misippus (Linnaeus, 1764) – pictured right
genus: Yoma

Yoma sabina parva (Butler, 1876)

genus: Junonia
- Northern argus, Junonia erigone (Cramer, 1775)

Junonia hedonia zelima (Fabricius, 1775)
Junonia orithya albicincta (Butler, 1875)
Junonia villida calybe (Godart, 1819)

genus: Vanessa
- Painted lady, Vanessa cardui (Linnaeus, 1758)
- Yellow admiral, Vanessa itea (Fabricius, 1775)
- Australian painted lady, Vanessa kershawi (McCoy, 1868) – pictured right
genus: Mynes
- Jezebel nymph, Mynes geoffroyi (Guérin-Méneville, 1830)

M. g. guerini (Wallace, 1869)

=== Biblidinae ===
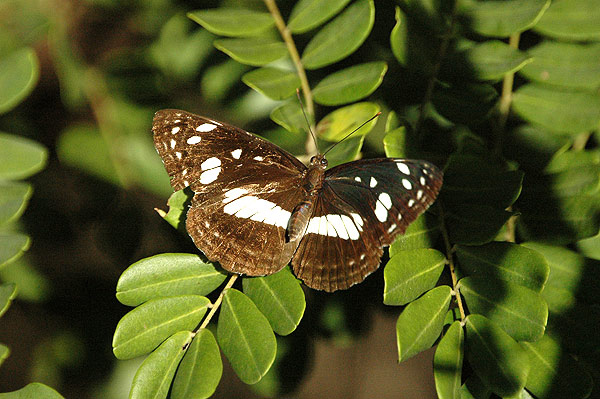
White-banded plane

subfamily: Biblidinae (planes)

genus: Pantoporia
- Orange plane, Pantoporia consimilis (Boisduval, 1832)

P. c. consimilis (Boisduval, 1832)

- Black-eyed plane, Pantoporia venilia (Linnaeus, 1758)

P. v. moorei (W. J. Macleay, 1866)

genus: Neptis
- Yellow-eyed plane, Neptis praslini (Boisduval, 1832)

N. p. staudingereana (de Nicéville, 1898)

genus: Phaedyma
- White-banded plane, Phaedyma shepherdi (Moore, 1858) – pictured right

P. s. shepherdi (Moore, 1858)

genus: Lexias
- Orange-banded plane, Lexias aeropa (Linnaeus, 1758)

=== Libytheinae ===
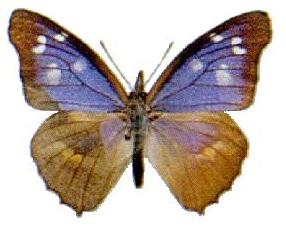
Purple beak

subfamily: Libytheinae

genus: Libythea
- Purple beak, Libythea geoffroy (Godart, 1824) – pictured right

L. g. genia (Waterhouse, 1938)
L. g. nicevillei (Olliff, 1891)

=== Danainae: milkweed butterflies ===
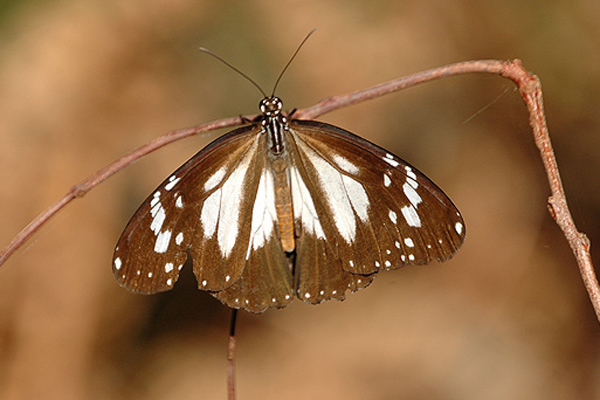
Swamp tiger

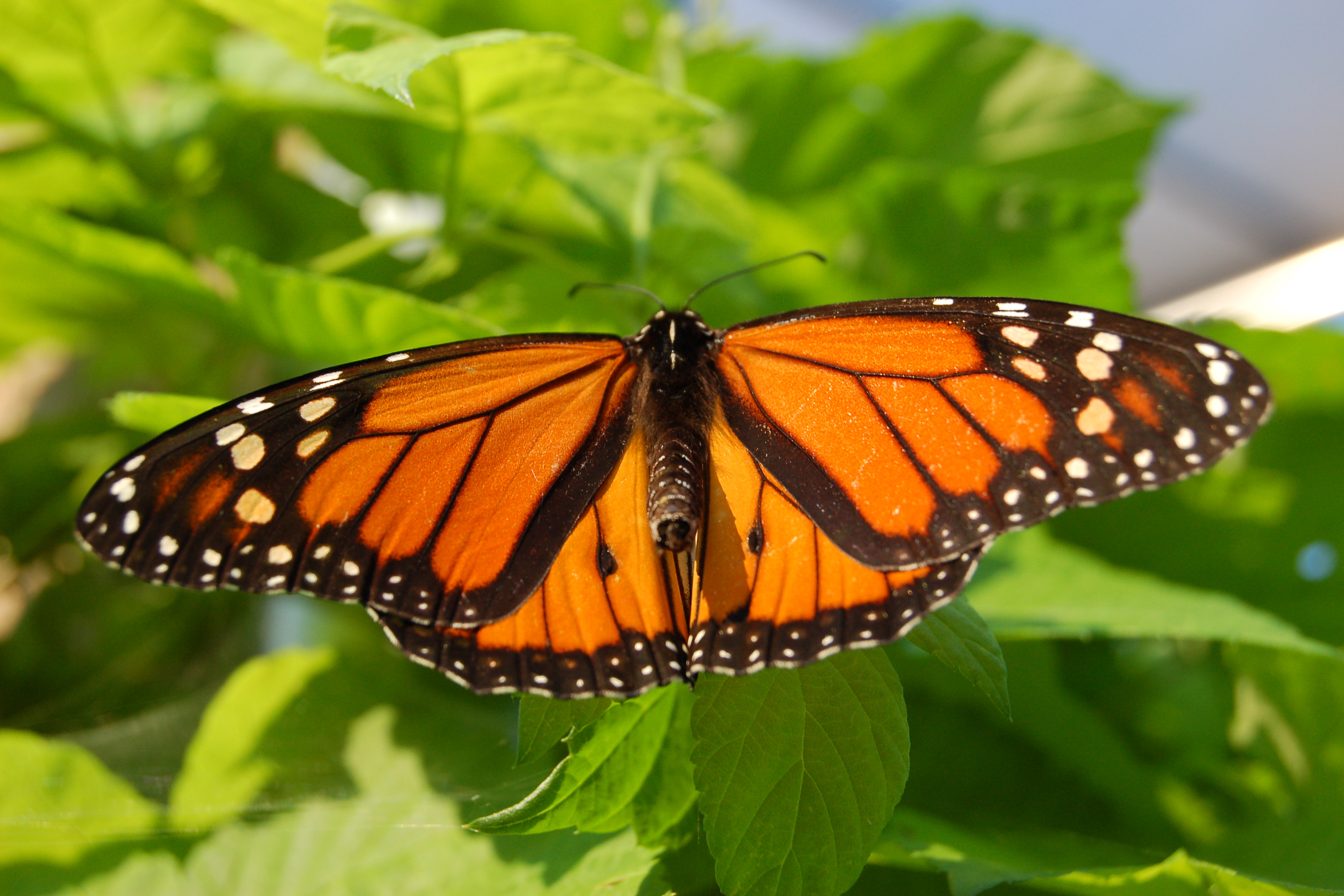
Monarch butterfly

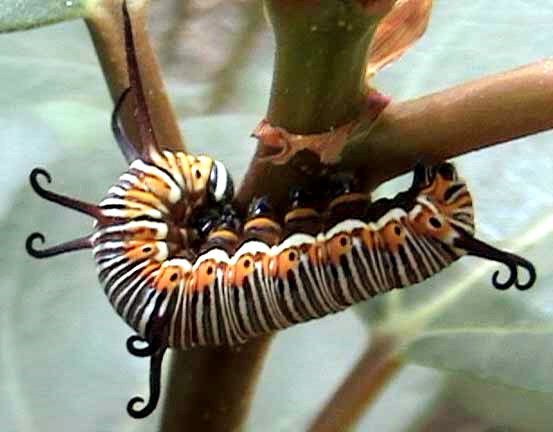
Common crow (caterpillar)

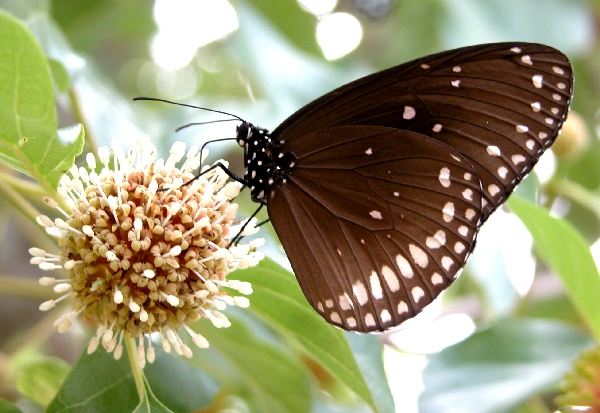
Two-brand crow

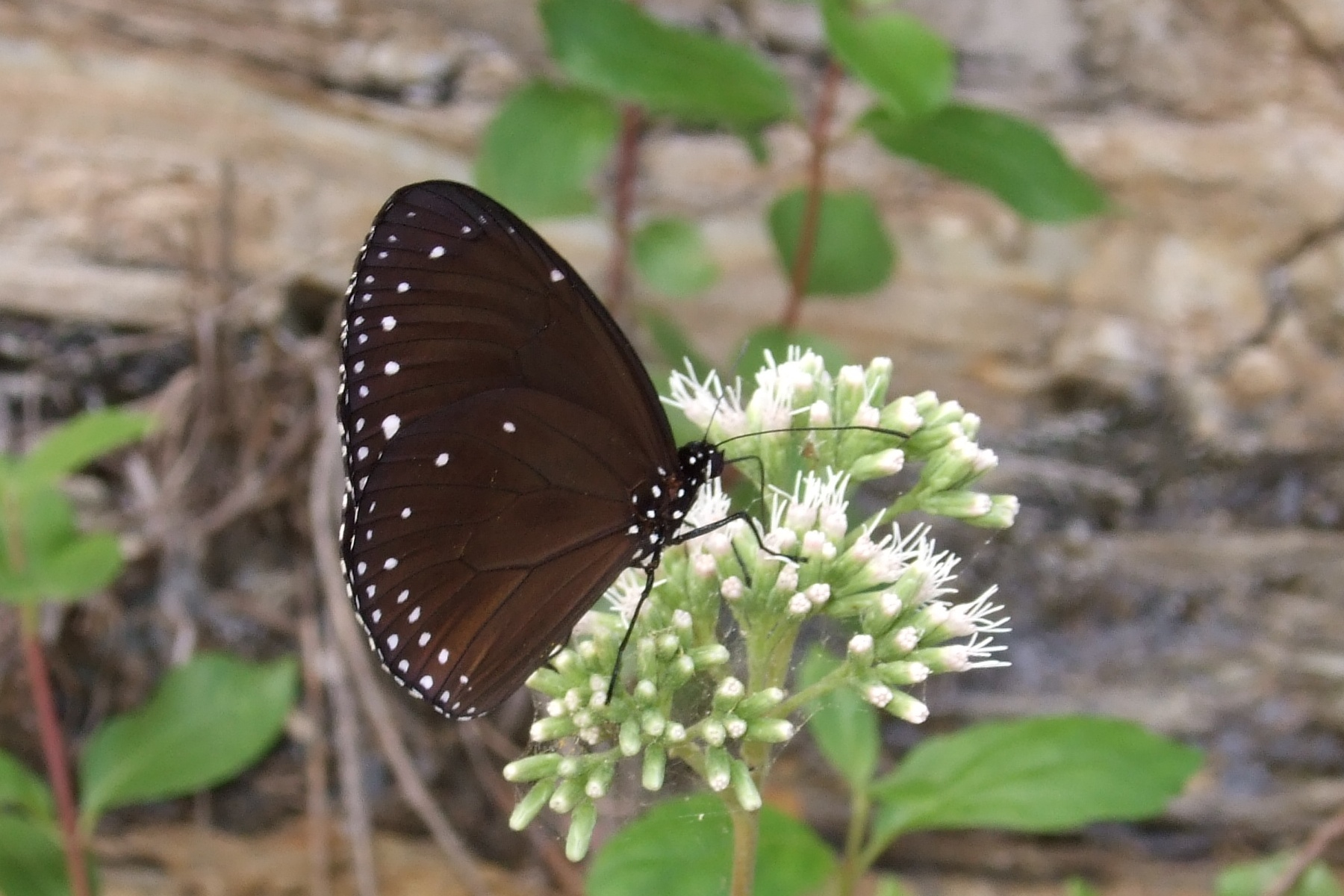
Purple crow

subfamily: Danainae (milkweed butterflies)

tribe: Danaini (tigers and crows)

genus Tirumala
- Blue tiger, Tirumala hamata (W. S. Macleay, 1826)

T. h. hamata (W. S. Macleay, 1826)

genus Danaus
- Swamp tiger, Danaus affinis (Fabricius, 1775) – pictured right

D. a. affinis (Fabricius, 1775)
D. a. alexis (Waterhouse & Lyell, 1914)
D. a. gelanor (Waterhouse & Lyell, 1914)
conspecific with: D. philene (Stoll, 1782)

- Orange tiger, Danaus genutia (Cramer, 1779)

D. g. alexis (Waterhouse & Lyell, 1914)

- Monarch or wanderer, Danaus plexippus (Linnaeus, 1758) – pictured right
- Lesser wanderer, Danaus chrysippus (Linnaeus, 1758)

D. c. petilia (Stoll, 1790)
D. c. cratippus (C. Felder, 1860)

genus Euploea
- No-brand crow, Euploea alcathoe (Godart, 1819)

E. a. eichhorni (Staudinger, 1884)
E. a. enastri (Fenner, 1991)
E. a. monilifera (Moore, 1883)

- Common crow, Euploea core (Cramer, 1780) – pictured right

E. c. corinna (W. S. Macleay, 1826)

- Mournful crow, Euploea algea (Godart, 1819)

E. a. violetta (Butler, 1876)

- Bates' crow, Euploea batesii (C. & R. Felder, 1865)

E. b. resarta (Butler, 1876)

- Climena crow, Euploea climena (Stoll, 1782)

E. c. macleari (Butler, 1887)

- Small brown crow, Euploea darchia (W. S. Macleay, 1826)

E. d. darchia (W. S. Macleay, 1826)
E. d. niveata (Butler, 1875)

- Orange-flash crow, Euploea leucostictos (Gmelin, 1790)
- Two-brand crow, Euploea sylvester (Fabricius, 1793) – pictured right

E. s. sylvester (Fabricius, 1793)
E. s. pelor (Doubleday, 1847)

- Purple crow, Euploea tulliolus (Fabricius, 1793) – pictured right

E. t. tulliolus (Fabricius, 1793)

- *Wide-brand crow, Euploea netscheri (Snellen, 1889) [*native to Dauan Island]

tribe: Tellervini

genus Tellervo
- Hamadryad, Tellervo zoilus (Fabricius, 1775)

Cairns hamadryad, Tellervo zoilus zoilus (Fabricius, 1775)
Cape York hamadryad, Tellervo zoilus gelo (Waterhouse & Lyell, 1914)

== Hesperiidae: skippers ==
family: Hesperiidae (skippers) – 121+1 species

=== Pyrginae: spread-winged skippers ===
subfamily: Pyrginae (spread-winged skippers) (Burmeister, 1878)

genus: dusk-flats, Chaetocneme (C. Felder, 1860)
- Ornate dusk-flat, Chaetocneme denitza (Hewitson, 1867)
- Eastern dusk-flat, Chaetocneme beata (Hewitson, 1867)
- Banded dusk-flat, Chaetocneme critomedia (Guérin-Méneville, 1831)

C. c. sphinterifera (Fruhstorfer, 1910)

- Purple dusk-flat, Chaetocneme porphyropis (Meyrick & Lower, 1902)
genus: Euschemon (Doubleday, 1846)

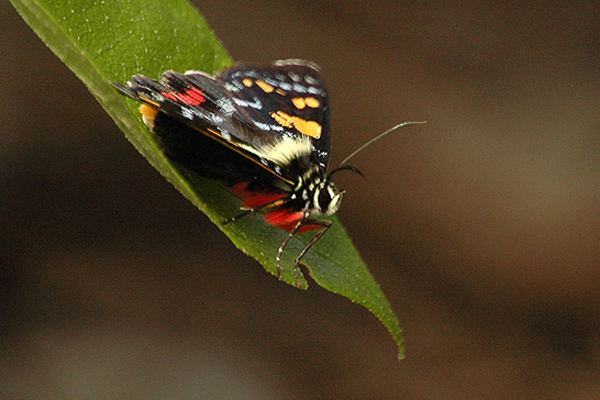
Euschemon rafflesia

- Regent skipper, Euschemon rafflesia (W. S. Macleay, 1826) – pictured right

E. r. rafflesia (W. S. Macleay, 1826)
E. r. alba (Mabille, 1903)

genus: Exometoeca
- Western flat, Exometoeca nycteris (Meyrick, 1888)
genus: Netrocoryne
- Bronze flat, Netrocoryne repanda (C. & R. Felder, 1867)

N. r. repanda (C. & R. Felder, 1867)
N. r. expansa (Waterhouse, 1932)

genus: Tagiades
- Pied flat, Tagiades japetus (Stoll, 1781)

T. j. janetta (Butler, 1870)

- *Papuan snow flat, Tagiades nestus (C. Felder, 1860)

=== Coeliadinae: awls, awlets and policemen ===
subfamily: Coeliadinae (awls, awlets and policemen)

genus: Allora
- Peacock awl, Allora doleschallii (C. Felder, 1860)
- Greater peacock awl, Allora major (Rothschild, 1915)
genus: Badamia
- Narrow-winged or brown awl, Badamia exclamationis (Fabricius, 1775)
genus: Hasora
- Green awl, Hasora discolor (C. & R. Felder, 1859)

H. d. mastusia (Fruhstorfer, 1911)

- Common banded awl, Hasora chromus (Cramer, 1780)

H. c. chromus (Cramer, 1780)

- Large banded awl, Hasora khoda (Mabille, 1876)

H. k. haslia (Swinhoe, 1899)

- Broad-banded awl, Hasora hurama (Butler, 1870)

=== Trapezitinae: Australian skippers ===
subfamily: Trapezitinae (Australian skippers)

- Blue-flash skipper, Rachelia extrusus (C. & R. Felder, 1867)
- Two-spotted grass-skipper, Pasma tasmanicus (Miskin, 1889)
- Barred skipper, Dispar compacta (Butler, 1882)
- Herimosa albovenata (Waterhouse, 1903)
- Anisyntoides argenteoornatus (Hewitson, 1868)
- Proeidosa polysema (Lower, 1908)
- Pseudoborbo bevani (Moore, 1878)
genus: Antipodia
- Antipodia atralba (Tepper, 1882)
- Antipodia chaostola (Meyrick, 1888)
- Antipodia dactyliota (Meyrick, 1888)
genus: Croitana
- Croitana aestiva (Edwards, 1979)
- Croitana arenaria (Edwards, 1979)
- Croitana croites (Hewitson, 1874)
genus: Herimosa (Atkins, 1994); previously Anisynta (Lower, 1911)
- White-veined sand-skipper, Anisynta albovenata (Waterhouse, 1940)
- Mottled grass-skipper, Anisynta cynone (Hewitson, 1874)

A. c. cynone (Hewitson, 1874)
A. c. gunneda (Couchman, 1954)

- Two-brand grass-skipper, Anisynta dominula (Plötz, 1884)
- Montane grass-skipper or mountain skipper, Anisynta monticolae (Olliff, 1890)
- Wedge grass-skipper, Anisynta sphenosema (Meyrick & Lower, 1902)
- Chequered grass-skipper, Anisynta tillyardi (Waterhouse & Lyell, 1912)
genus: Hesperilla
- Hesperilla chrysotricha (Meyrick & Lower, 1902)
- Hesperilla crypsargyra (Meyrick, 1888)
- Hesperilla crypsigramma (Meyrick & Lower, 1902)
- Hesperilla donnysa (Hewitson, 1868)
- Hesperilla flavescens (Waterhouse, 1903)
- Hesperilla furva (Sands & Kerr, 1973)
- Hesperilla idothea (Miskin, 1889)
- Hesperilla malindeva (Lower, 1911)
- Hesperilla mastersi (Waterhouse, 1903)
- Hesperilla ornata (Leach, 1814)
- Hesperilla picta (Leach, 1814)
- Hesperilla sarnia (Atkins, 1978)
- Hesperilla sexguttata (Herrich-Schäffer, 1869)
genus: Mesodina
- Mesodina aeluropis (Meyrick, 1901)
- Mesodina cyanophracta (Lower, 1911)
- Mesodina gracillima (Edwards, 1987)
- Mesodina halyzia (Hewitson, 1868)
- Mesodina hayi (Edwards & A. J. Graham, 1995)
genus: Motasingha
- Motasingha dirphia (Hewitson, 1868)
- Motasingha trimaculata (Tepper, 1882)
genus: Neohesperilla
- Neohesperilla croceus (Miskin, 1889)
- Neohesperilla senta (Miskin, 1891)
- Neohesperilla xanthomera (Meyrick & Lower, 1902)
- Neohesperilla xiphiphora (Lower, 1911)
genus: Oreisplanus
- Oreisplanus munionga (Olliff, 1890)
- Oreisplanus perornata (Kirby, 1893)
genus: Signeta
- Signeta flammeata (Butler, 1882)
- Signeta tymbophora (Meyrick & Lower, 1902)
genus: Toxidia
- Toxidia andersoni (Kirby, 1893)
- Toxidia doubledayi (C. Felder, 1862)
- Toxidia inornatus (Butler, 1883)
- Toxidia melania (Waterhouse, 1903)
- Toxidia parvulus (Plötz, 1884)
- Toxidia peron (Latreille, 1809)
- Toxidia rietmanni (Semper, 1879)
- Toxidia thyrrhus (Mabille, 1891)
genus: Trapezites
- Silver-spotted ochre, Trapezites argenteoornatus (Hewitson, 1868)
- Speckled ochre, Trapezites atkinsi (A. A. E. Williams, M. R. Williams & R. W. Hay, 1998)
- Orange ochre, Trapezites eliena (Hewitson, 1868)
- Ornate ochre, Trapezites genevieveae (Atkins, 1997)
- Small orange ochre, Trapezites heteromacula (Meyrick & Lower, 1902)
- Silver-studded ochre, Trapezites iacchoides (Waterhouse, 1903)
- Brown ochre, Trapezites iacchus (Fabricius, 1775)
- Yellow ochre, Trapezites lutea (Tepper, 1882)
- Bronze ochre, Trapezites macqueeni (Kerr & Sands, 1970)
- Northern silver ochre, Trapezites maheta (Hewitson, 1877)
- Black-ringed ochre, Trapezites petalia (Hewitson, 1868)
- Heath ochre, Trapezites phigalia (Hewitson, 1868)
- Montane ochre, Trapezites phigalioides (Waterhouse, 1903)
- Southern silver ochre, Trapezites praxedus (Plötz, 1884)
- Sciron ochre, Trapezites sciron (Waterhouse & Lyell, 1914)
- Splendid ochre, Trapezites symmomus (Hübner, 1823)
- Sandstone ochre, Trapezites taori (Atkins, 1997)
- Laterite ochre, Trapezites waterhouse (Mayo & Atkins, 1992)

=== Hesperinae: grass skippers ===
subfamily: Hesperinae (grass skippers)

- Mimene atropatene (Fruhstorfer, 1911)
genus: Notocrypta
- Notocrypta waigensis (Plötz, 1882)

N. w. proserpina (Butler, 1883)

genus: Taractrocera
- Taractrocera anisomorpha (Lower, 1911)
- Taractrocera dolon (Plötz, 1884)
- Taractrocera ilia (Waterhouse, 1903)

T. i. ilia (Waterhouse, 1903)

- Taractrocera ina (Waterhouse, 1903)
- Taractrocera papyria (Boisduval, 1832)
genus: Ocybadistes
- Ocybadistes ardea (Bethune-Baker, 1906)

O. a. ardea (Bethune-Baker, 1906)
O. a. heterobathra (Lower, 1908)

- Ocybadistes flavovittata (Latreille, 1824)
- Ocybadistes hypomeloma (Lower, 1911)
- Ocybadistes knightorum (Lambkin & Donaldson, 1994)
- Ocybadistes walkeri (Heron, 1894)
genus: Suniana
- Suniana lascivia (Rosenstock, 1885)
- Suniana sunias (C. Felder, 1860)
genus: Arrhenes
- Arrhenes dschilus (Plötz, 1885)

A. d. iris (Waterhouse, 1903)

- Arrhenes marnas (C. Felder, 1860)

A. m. affinis (Waterhouse & Lyell, 1912)

genus: Telicota
- Telicota ancilla (Herrich-Schäffer, 1869)
- Telicota anisodesma (Lower, 1911)
- Telicota augias (Linnaeus, 1763)

T. a. krefftii (W. J. Macleay, 1866)

- Telicota brachydesma (Lower, 1908)
- Telicota colon (Fabricius, 1775)

T. c. argeus (Plötz, 1883)

- Telicota eurotas (C. Felder, 1860)
- Telicota eurychlora (Lower, 1908)
- Telicota mesoptis (Lower, 1911)

T. m. mesoptis (Lower, 1911)

- Telicota ohara (Plötz, 1883)
genus: Cephrenes
- Cephrenes augiades (C. Felder, 1860)

C. a. sperthias (C. Felder, 1862)

- Cephrenes trichopepla (Lower, 1908)
genus: Sabera
- Sabera caesina (Hewitson, 1886)
- Sabera dobboe (Plötz, 1883)
- Sabera fuliginosa (Miskin, 1889)
genus: Pelopidas
- Pelopidas agna (Evans, 1866)
- Pelopidas lyelli (Rothschild, 1915)
genus: Parnara
- Parnara amalia (Semper, 1879)
- Parnara bada (Waterhouse, 1903)
genus: Borbo
- Rice swift, Borbo cinnara (Wallace, 1866)
- Borbo impar (Mabille, 1883)

B. i. lavinia (Waterhouse, 1932)
B. i. tetragaphus (Mabille, 1891)

== Remote islands species ==
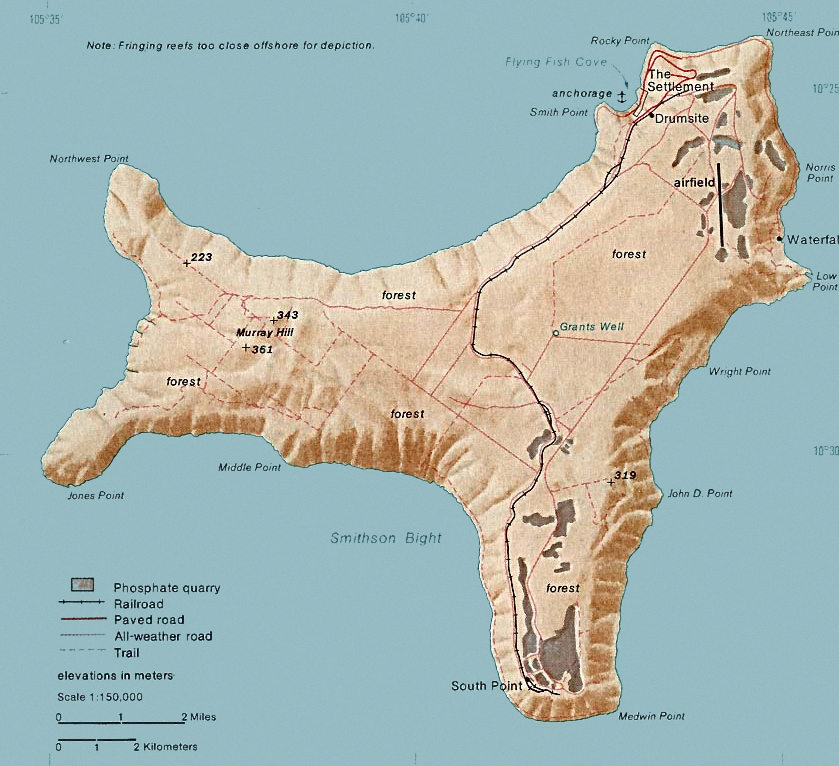
Christmas Island

Australia has 8,222 islands within her maritime borders. This is small in comparison with her northern neighbour Indonesia, with about 18,300 islands (high geological activity is constantly adding and removing Indonesian islands). The British Isles include more than 6,000 islands over a much smaller area. The Greek islands include about as many islands depending on the minimum size to take into account, but in an even smaller area.

=== Christmas Island (105°E) ===
- Christmas swallowtail, Papilio memnon (Linnaeus, 1758)
- Striped albatross, Appias olferna (Swinhoe, 1890)
- Christmas emperor, Polyura andrewsi (Butler, 1900)
- King cerulean, Jamides bochus (Stoll, 1782)
- Lesser grass-blue, Zizina otis (Fabricius, 1787)
- Papuan grass-yellow, Eurema blanda (Boisduval, 1836) (also on Darnley Island)
- Eurema alitha (C. & R. Felder, 1832)
- Euploea climena macleari (Butler, 1887)
- Badamia exclamationis (Fabricius, 1775)
- Borbo cinnara (Wallace, 1866)
- Catochrysops panormus exiguus
- Catopsilia pomona (Fabricius, 1775)
- Junonia villida
- Hasora chromus (Cramer, 1780)
- Hypolimnas anomala (Wallace, 1869)
- Hypolimnas bolina nerina (Fabricius, 1775)
- Hypolimnas misippus
- Lampides boeticus (Linnaeus, 1767)
- Nacaduba kurava (Moore, 1858)

=== Torres Strait islands (142–144°E) ===
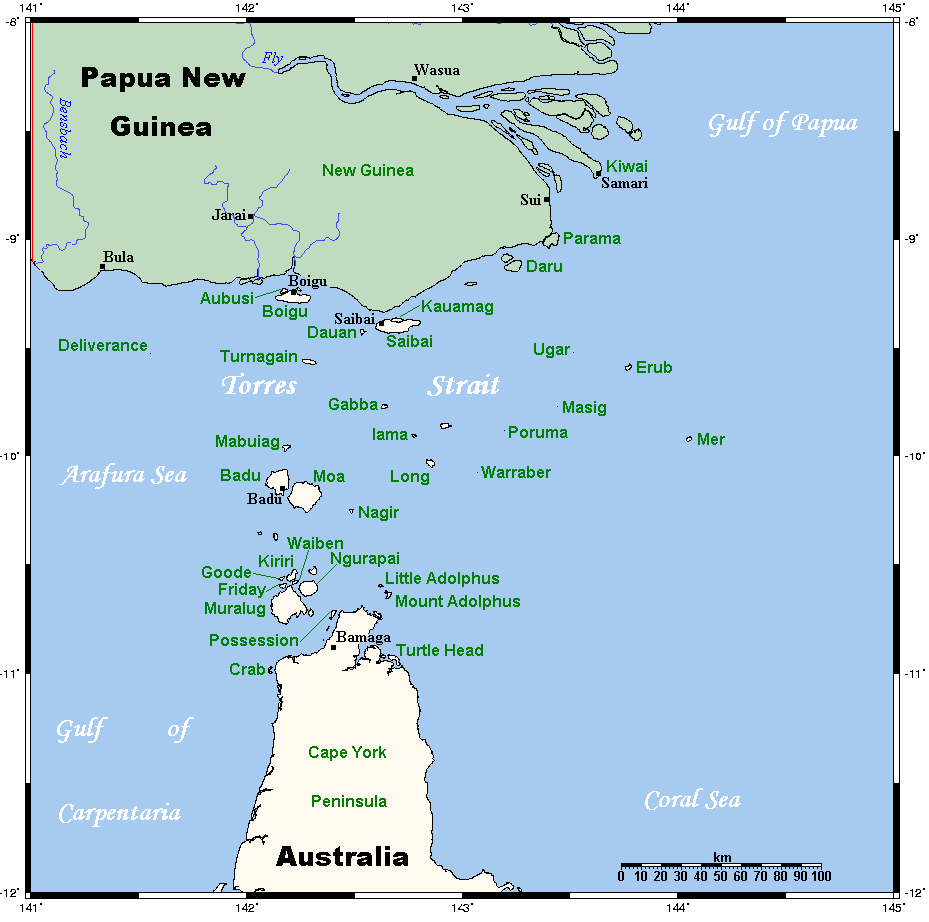
Torres Strait islands

Dauan Island (Dauan, 142.5°E)

- Violet line-blue, Nacaduba calauria (C. Felder, 1860) (also on Murray Island)
- White-brand crow, Euploea netscheri (Snellen, 1889)
- Gracile line-blue, Prosotas gracilis (Röber, 1886)

Saibai Island (Saibai, 142.7°E)

- Silky owl, Taenaris catops (Westwood, 1851) – (also on Darnley Island)

Yorke Island (Masig, 143.4°E)

- Spotted crow eggfly, Hypolimnas antilope (Cramer, 1777) (also on Murray Island)

Darnley Island (Erub, 143.7°E)

- Papuan grass-yellow, Eurema blanda (Boisduval, 1836) (also on Christmas Island)
- Papuan snow flat, Tagiades nestus (C. Felder, 1860)
- Banded evening brown, Melanitis amabilis (Boisduval, 1832)
- Papuan cerulean, Jamides nemophila (Butler, 1876)
- Bold line-blue, Nacaduba pactolus (C. Felder, 1860) (also on Murray Island)
- Silky owl, Taenaris catops (Westwood, 1851) (also on Saibai Island)

Murray Island (Mer, 144.0°E)

- Papuan evening brown, Melanitis constantia (Cramer, 1777)
- Dark green-banded blue, Nothodanis schaeffera (Eschscholtz, 1821)
- Violet line-blue, Nacaduba calauria (C. Felder, 1860) (also on Dauan Island)
- Spotted crow eggfly, Hypolimnas antilope (Cramer, 1777) (also on Yorke Island)

=== Norfolk Island (168°E) ===
- Norfolk swallowtail, Papilio amynthor (Boisduval, 1859)

== Glossary ==
- aestivation – summer dormancy
- anal vein – sixth wing vein, parallel to dorsum
- androconia —
- apical area —
- apical claw —
- apical spurs —
- apiculus —
- bifid – two-pronged
- discal cell —
- imago – adult insect; fully grown, sexually mature

== Major collections ==
Butterflies (Papilionoidea and Hesperioidea) in principal collections
Collection	Specimens	Amateur	Percent
ANIC, Canberra	115,000	92,000	80%
Australian Museum, Sydney	65,000	63,900	98%
Museum of Victoria	24,000	18,000	75%
Queensland Museum	9,000	6,300	70%
South Australian Museum	36,000	19,800	55%
Total	249,000	200,000	80%

=== Museums outside of Australia with significant Australian butterfly collections ===
- UK British Museum: 25,000 Australian butterflies; includes specimens collected by Joseph Banks, Walter Rothschild and Cajetan and Rudolf Felder.
- UK Hope Entomology Collections, Oxford University Museum of Natural History: 1,600 Australian butterflies.
- RF Muséum National d'Histoire Naturelle, Paris: 10,000 Australian butterflies; includes specimens collected by Hans Fruhstorfer.
- BRD de:Staatliches Museum für Naturkunde Karlsruhe: 5,000–10,000 Australian butterflies.
- USA Jean Louis Rodolphe Agassiz Museum of Comparative Zoology, Harvard University: substantial Australian butterfly holdings, though numbers have not been estimated; includes specimens collected by RG Wind and Harry Kendon Clench.

== See also ==
collections

- Australian Butterfly Sanctuary, Kuranda [live specimens]
- Macleay Museum, University of Sydney [dead specimens]

butterfly lists

- List of butterflies of Great Britain
- List of butterflies of India
- List of butterflies of North America
- List of butterflies of Tasmania
- List of butterflies of Victoria

Australian animal lists

- List of moths of Australia
- List of common spider species of Australia

== Bibliography ==
- Braby, Michael F. Butterflies of Australia: their identification, biology and distribution. 2 volumes. Melbourne: CSIRO Publishing, 2000.

[Reviewed in Australian Journal of Entomology 40 (2001): 202–204.]

- Braby, Michael F. The Complete Guide to Butterflies of Australia. Corrected edition. Collingwood, Victoria: CSIRO Publishing, 2005.
- Common, Ian FB and Doug F Waterhouse. Butterflies of Australia. 2nd edition. Sydney: Angus & Robertson, 1981.
- Edwards, ED, A. Wells, WWK Houston, J Newland and L Regan. Lepidoptera: Hesperioidea, Papilionoidea. Zoological Catalogue of Australia 31.6. CSIRO Publishing, 2001.
- Kitching, Roger L. (ed.). Biology of Australian Butterflies. Monographs on Australian Lepidoptera 6. CSIRO Publishing, 1997.

=== Taxonomic authorities ===
- Doubleday, Edward, John Obadiah Westwood and William Chapman Hewitson. The Genera of Diurnal Lepidoptera: Comprising Their Generic Characters, A Notice of Their Habits and Transformations, and A Catalogue of the Species of Each Genus. London: Longman, Brown, Green, and Longmans, 1846–52.
- Felder, Cajetan Freiherr von. 1860.
- Felder, Cajetan Freiherr von and Rudolf Felder. "Reise der Österreichischen Fregatte Novara in den Jahren 1857, 1858, 1859". Zoologischer Thiel 2 (1867): xx–xx. Illustrations by sk:Alois Friedrich Rogenhofer are here at Wikicommons
- Fruhstorfer, Hans. "Die Indo-Australischen Tagfalter". [Family Erycinidae]. Pages 767–798 in Adalbert Seitz (ed.), Die Gross-Schmetterlinge der Erde: eine systematische Bearbeitung der bis jetzt bekannten Gross-Schmetterlinge. Volume 9. Stuttgart: Alfred Kernen, 1914. (in German)
- Guérin-Méneville, Félix Édouard. 1831.
- Hewitson, William Chapman. Illustrations of New Species of Exotic Butterflies: Selected chiefly from the collections of W. Wilson Saunders and William C. Hewitson. 5 volumes. London: John Van Voorst, 1851, 1862–1871, 1878.
- Hewitson, William Chapman. Illustrations of diurnal Lepidoptera. Part I. Lycænidae. London: John Van Voorst, 1867. [First published 1863, reprinted with additions until 1878.]
- Latreille, Pierre André. 1809.
- Linnaeus, Carl. Systema Naturae. 10th edition. 1758. Page 458ff.
- Macleay, William John.
- Macleay, William Sharp. "Annulosa, catalogue of insects, collected by Captain King, RN". Appendix B, pp. 438–469 in Phillip Parker King. Narrative of a Survey of the Intertropical and Western Coasts of Australia. London: John Murray, 1826.
- Miskin, William Henry
- Meyrick, Edward. 1888.
- Meyrick, Edward and OB Lower. "Revision of the Australian Hesperiadae". Transactions and Proceedings and Report of the Royal Society of South Australia 35 (1902): 112–172. ISSN 1324-177X (1877–1958)
- Olliff, Arthur Sidney.
- Tindale, Norman Barnett. "A new butterfly of the genus Papilio from Arnhem Land". Records of the South Australian Museum 3 (1927): 103–134. ISSN 0376-2750
- Tindale, Norman Barnett. "A new butterfly of the Ogyris." South Australian Naturalist (1952). ISSN 0038-2965
- Tindale, Norman Barnett. "New Rhopalocera and a list of species from the Grampian Mountains, Western Victoria." Records of the South Australian Museum (1953).
- Waterhouse, Gustavus Athol. What Butterfly is That? A Guide to the Butterflies of Australia. 8 volumes. Sydney: Angus and Robertson, 1932. [Reviewed in Nature (1933).]
- Westwood, John Obadiah.
