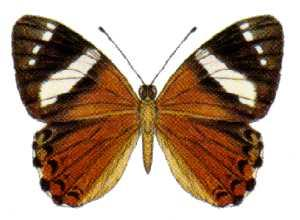

Scientific classification
- Kingdom: Animalia
- Phylum: Arthropoda
- Clade: Pancrustacea
- Class: Insecta
- Order: Lepidoptera
- Family: Riodinidae
- Genus: Praetaxila
- Species: P. segecia

Binomial name
- Praetaxila segecia (Hewitson, 1861)

Synonyms
- Sospita segecia

= Praetaxila segecia =

Species of butterfly

Praetaxilia segecia, commonly known as the harlequin metalmark or Australian metalmark, is the only butterfly of the metalmark family, Riodinidae, found in Australia, where it is restricted to northern Queensland. It is also found in New Guinea and on nearby smaller islands such as Aru.
