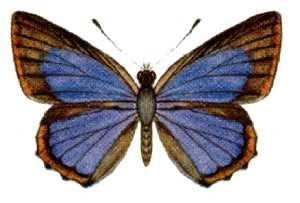

Scientific classification
- Domain: Eukaryota
- Kingdom: Animalia
- Phylum: Arthropoda
- Class: Insecta
- Order: Lepidoptera
- Family: Lycaenidae
- Genus: Hypochrysops
- Species: H. halyaetus

Binomial name
- Hypochrysops halyaetus Hewitson, 1874

= Hypochrysops halyaetus =

Species of butterfly

Hypochrysops halyaetus, the western jewell, is a member of the family Lycaenidae of butterflies. It lives in Australia.
