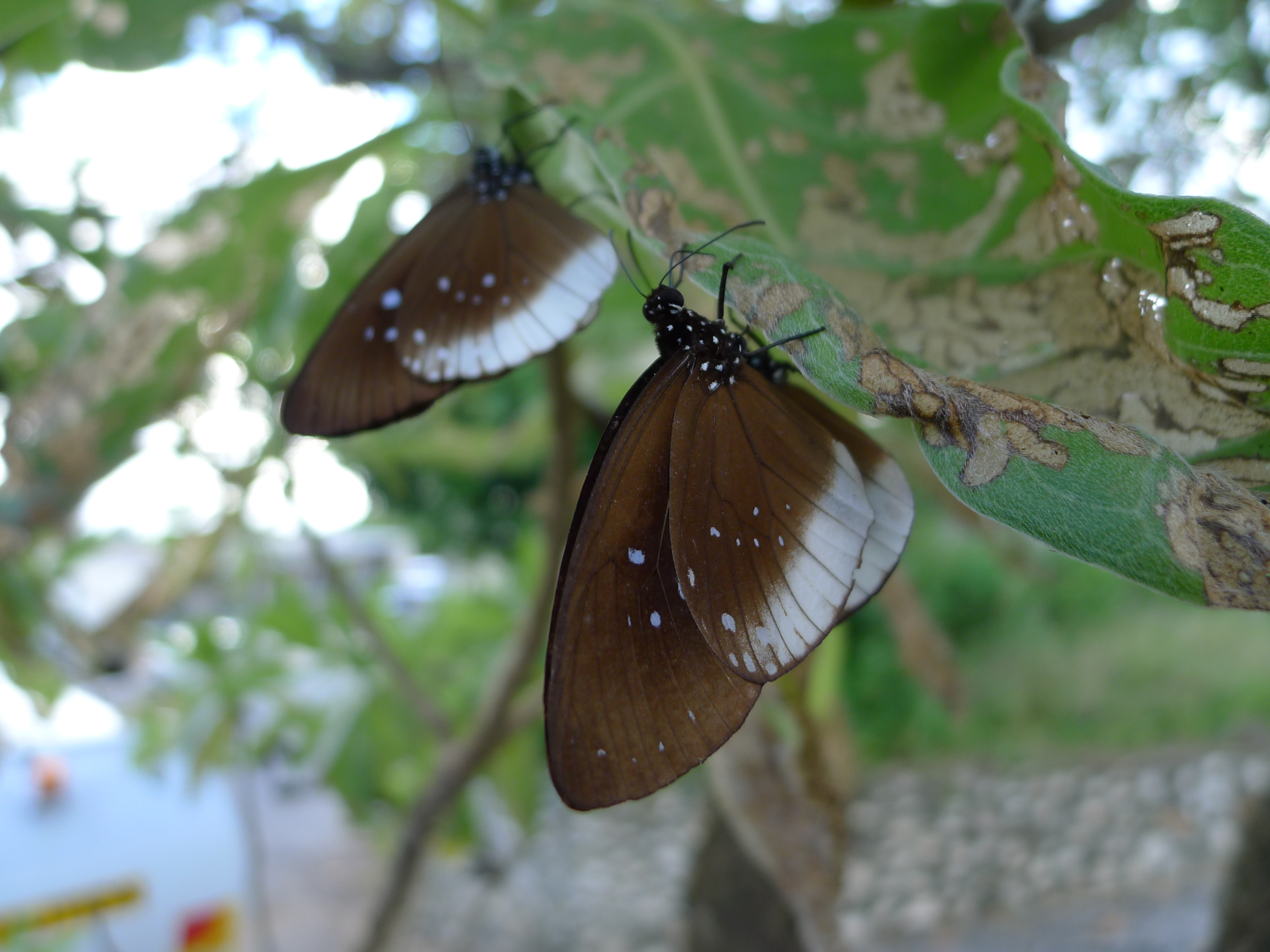

Scientific classification
- Kingdom: Animalia
- Phylum: Arthropoda
- Clade: Pancrustacea
- Class: Insecta
- Order: Lepidoptera
- Family: Nymphalidae
- Genus: Euploea
- Species: E. climena

Binomial name
- Euploea climena (Stoll, [1782])

Synonyms
- Papilio climena Stoll, [1782]; Cratia limnoria Hübner, 1816; Euploea zinckenii C. & R. Felder, [1865]; camorta Wood-Mason & de Nicéville, 1881; Euploea servillei Moore, 1883; Euploea sobrina Röber, 1891; Euploea compta Röber, 1891; enganensis Doherty, 1891; Euploea compta eucompta Fruhstorfer, 1903; Euploea compta adorabilis Fruhstorfer, 1904; Euploea (Vadebra) compta virudha Fruhstorfer, 1904; moasana Fruhstorfer, 1911; albitincta Talbot & Le Cerf, 1925; linneaeuruthaebryakae Bryk, 1937; alora Morishita, 1981; Danais melina Godart, 1819; Vadebra murrayi Butler, 1884; Euploea eurypon Hewitson, 1858; Euploea vicina C. & R. Felder, [1865]; Euploea sepulchralis Butler, 1866; Euploea (Crastia) simulatrix Wood-Mason & de Nicéville, 1881; Vadebra macleari Butler, 1887; Euploea malindeva Waterhouse & Lyell, 1914; Euploea (Crastia/Vadebra) palmedo Doherty, 1891; Euploea neptis Röber, 1891; Euploea (Vadebra) elwesiana de Nicéville, 1897; Vadebra dohertyi Holland, 1900; Euploea nobilis Strand, 1914; Euploea nobilis ab. simplicior Strand, 1914; zavata Strand, 1914

= Euploea climena =

Species of butterfly

Euploea climena is a butterfly in the family Nymphalidae. It was described by Caspar Stoll in 1782. It is found in the Indomalayan realm and the Australasian realm.

== Subspecies ==
- E. c. climena (Ambon)
- E. c. melina (Godart, 1819) (Serang)
- E. c. eurypon Hewitson, 1858 (Aru, Kai Island)
- E. c. sepulchralis Butler, 1866 (West Java, Bawean)
- E. c. simulatrix Wood-Mason & de Nicéville, 1881 (Nicobars)
- E. c. macleari (Butler, 1887) (Christmas Island, Northwest Australia)
- E. c. palmedo Doherty, 1891 (Sumba)
- E. c. neptis Röber, 1891 (Flores)
- E. c. elwesiana de Nicéville, 1897 (Bali, Lombok, Sumbawa)
- E. c. dohertyi (Holland, 1900) (Buru)
- E. c. bandana Fruhstorfer, 1904 (Banda Island)
- E. c. valeriana Fruhstorfer, 1904 (Romang Island)
- E. c. terissa Fruhstorfer, 1910 (East Java)
- E. c. nobilis Strand, 1914 (Admiralty Islands)
