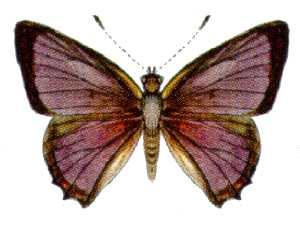

Scientific classification
- Domain: Eukaryota
- Kingdom: Animalia
- Phylum: Arthropoda
- Class: Insecta
- Order: Lepidoptera
- Family: Lycaenidae
- Genus: Hypochrysops
- Species: H. epicurus

Binomial name
- Hypochrysops epicurus Miskin (1876)

= Hypochrysops epicurus =

Species of butterfly

Hypochrysops epicurus, the dull jewel, is a butterfly of the family Lycaenidae found in Australia.
