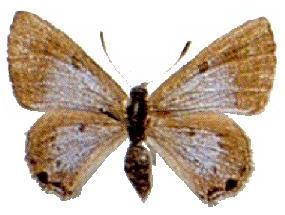

Scientific classification
- Domain: Eukaryota
- Kingdom: Animalia
- Phylum: Arthropoda
- Class: Insecta
- Order: Lepidoptera
- Family: Lycaenidae
- Genus: Acrodipsas
- Species: A. melania

Binomial name
- Acrodipsas melania Sands, 1980

= Grey ant-blue =

Species of butterfly

The grey ant-blue (Acrodipsas melania) is a butterfly native to Australia.
