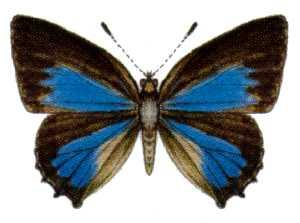

Scientific classification
- Domain: Eukaryota
- Kingdom: Animalia
- Phylum: Arthropoda
- Class: Insecta
- Order: Lepidoptera
- Family: Lycaenidae
- Genus: Hypochrysops
- Species: H. narcissus

Binomial name
- Hypochrysops narcissus Fabricius (1775)

= Hypochrysops narcissus =

Species of butterfly

Hypochrysops narcissus, the Narcissus jewel, is a member of the family Lycaenidae of butterflies.
