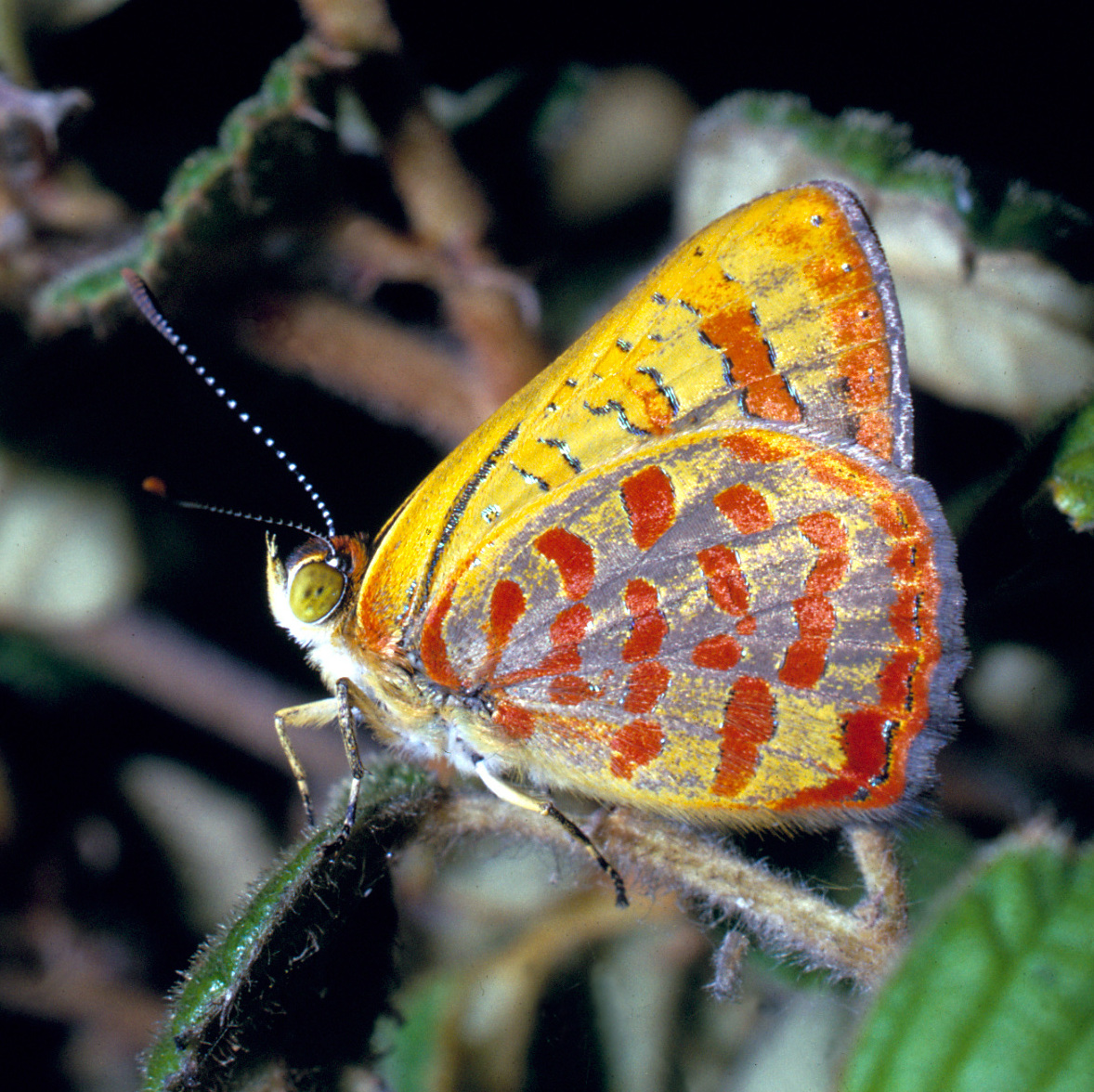

Scientific classification
- Domain: Eukaryota
- Kingdom: Animalia
- Phylum: Arthropoda
- Class: Insecta
- Order: Lepidoptera
- Family: Lycaenidae
- Genus: Hypochrysops
- Species: H. byzos

Binomial name
- Hypochrysops byzos Boisduval (1832)

= Hypochrysops byzos =

Species of butterfly

Hypochrysops byzos, the yellow-spot jewel, is a member of the family Lycaenidae. Its range consist of eastern Australia. The wingspan of both the male and female is about 3 cm.
