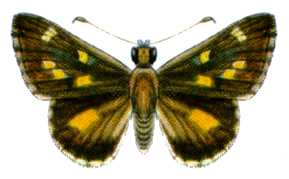

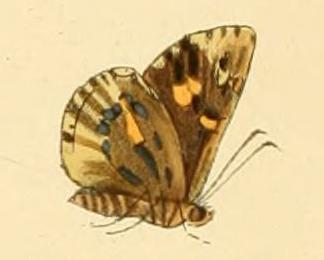

Scientific classification
- Kingdom: Animalia
- Phylum: Arthropoda
- Class: Insecta
- Order: Lepidoptera
- Family: Hesperiidae
- Genus: Trapezites
- Species: T. argenteoornatus

Binomial name
- Trapezites argenteoornatus Hewitson, 1868

Synonyms
- Cyclopides argenteoornatus; Anisyntoides argenteoornatus; Anisynta insula

= Trapezites argenteoornatus =

Species of butterfly

Trapezites argenteoornatus, the silver spotted skipper, is a butterfly of the family Hesperiidae. It is found in Western Australia.

The wingspan is about 30 mm.

The larvae feed on Acanthocarpus preissii, Acanthocarpus verticillatus, and Acanthocarpus robustus.
