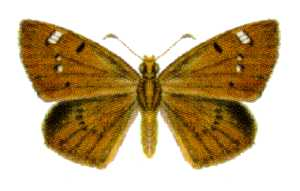

Scientific classification
- Kingdom: Animalia
- Phylum: Arthropoda
- Clade: Pancrustacea
- Class: Insecta
- Order: Lepidoptera
- Family: Hesperiidae
- Subfamily: Tagiadinae
- Tribe: Netrocorynini
- Genus: Exometoeca; Meyrick, 1888
- Species: E. nycteris

Binomial name
- Exometoeca nycteris Meyrick, 1888

= Exometoeca =

Exometoeca nycteris

Genus of butterflies

Exometoeca is a genus of skipper butterflies in the family Hesperiidae. It is monotypic, with the only species being Exometoeca nycteris.
