= Allocasuarina hystricosa =

Conservation status
- Priority Four — Rare Taxa (DEC)

Scientific classification
- Kingdom: Plantae
- Clade: Tracheophytes
- Clade: Angiosperms
- Clade: Eudicots
- Clade: Rosids
- Order: Fagales
- Family: Casuarinaceae
- Genus: Allocasuarina
- Species: A. hystricosa

Binomial name
- Allocasuarina hystricosa Wege

Species of tree

Allocasuarina hystricosa is a species of flowering plant in the family Casuarinaceae and is endemic to the south of Western Australia. It is a dioecious shrub with more or less erect branchlets, the leaves reduced to scales in whorls of ten to twelve, the fruiting cones 13–30 mm (0.51–1.18 in) long containing winged seeds (samaras) 4.5–9 mm (0.18–0.35 in) long.

== Description ==
Allocasuarina hystricosa is a dioecious shrub that typically grows to a height of up to 3 m (9.8 ft). Its branchlets are more or less erect, up to 300 mm (12 in) long and slightly scaly, the leaves reduced to erect, scale-like teeth 0.8–1.5 mm (0.031–0.059 in) long, arranged in whorls of ten to twelve around the branchlets. The sections of branchlet between the leaf whorls (the "articles") are mostly 15–35 mm (0.59–1.38 in) long and 0.9–1.3 mm (0.035–0.051 in) wide. Male flowers are arranged in sessile spikes 4–15 mm (0.16–0.59 in) long on older branchlets, the anthers 0.6–0.8 mm (0.024–0.031 in) long. Female cones are sessile and usually oblong to elliptic in outline, 10–30 mm (0.39–1.18 in) long and 13–18 mm (0.51–0.71 in) wide when mature. Male flowers have been observed in February and female flowers in February, April, June and December, and the samaras are reddish-brown to brownish-black and 4.5–9 mm (0.18–0.35 in) long. This sheoak is similar to A. scleroclada, but that species has drooping branchlets and slightly longer articles and teeth.

== Taxonomy ==
Allocasuarina hystericosa was first formally described in 2007 by Juliet Wege in the journal Nuytsia from specimens collected east of Ravensthorpe in 2007. The specific epithet, (anfractuosa) means "sinuous", referring to the branchlets. The specific epithet (hystricosa) means prickly or thorny, with reference to the spiny protuberances on the cones.

== Distribution and habitat ==
The species grows in mallee shrubland or heath, in association with Acacia ophiolithica, Hakea verrucosa and Allocasuarina campestris. It also forms small dense stands, sometimes with Melaleuca pauperiflora and Gahnia lanigera. It occurs on plains, slopes and hilltops in small populations between Bendalup Hill and the Eyre Range north-east of Ravensthorpe in the Esperance Plains bioregion of southern Western Australia.

== Conservation status ==
Allocasuarina hystricosa is listed as "Priority Four" by the Government of Western Australia Department of Biodiversity, Conservation and Attractions, meaning that it is rare or near threatened.
