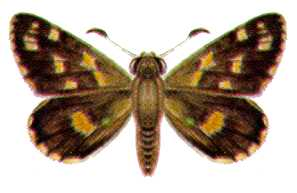

Scientific classification
- Kingdom: Animalia
- Phylum: Arthropoda
- Class: Insecta
- Order: Lepidoptera
- Family: Hesperiidae
- Subfamily: Trapezitinae
- Genus: Oreisplanus; Waterhouse & Lyell, 1914

= Oreisplanus =

Genus of butterflies

Oreisplanus is a genus of skipper butterflies in the family Hesperiidae.

== Species ==
- Oreisplanus munionga Olliff, 1890
- Oreisplanus perornata Kirby, 1893
