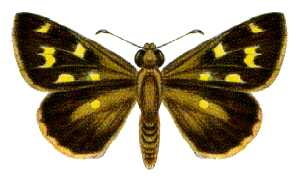
- Motasingha dirphia

Scientific classification
- Kingdom: Animalia
- Phylum: Arthropoda
- Class: Insecta
- Order: Lepidoptera
- Family: Hesperiidae
- Subfamily: Trapezitinae
- Genus: Motasingha; Watson, 1893

= Motasingha =

Genus of butterflies

Motasingha is a genus of skipper butterflies in the family Hesperiidae.

== Species ==
- Motasingha dirphia Hewitson, 1868
- Motasingha trimaculata Tepper, 1882
