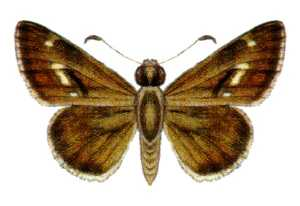

Scientific classification
- Domain: Eukaryota
- Kingdom: Animalia
- Phylum: Arthropoda
- Class: Insecta
- Order: Lepidoptera
- Family: Hesperiidae
- Genus: Hesperilla
- Species: H. sexguttata

Binomial name
- Hesperilla sexguttata Herrich-Schäffer, 1869

Synonyms
- Toxidia sexguttata sela Waterhouse, 1932

= Hesperilla sexguttata =

Species of butterfly

Hesperilla sexguttata, also known as the riverine sedge-skipper or six-spot skipper, is a species of butterfly in the family Hesperiidae. It is found in Australia in the Northern Territory, Queensland and Western Australia.

The wingspan is about 25 mm.

The larvae feed on Cyperus decompositus, Cyperus javanicus and Cyperus microcephalus.
