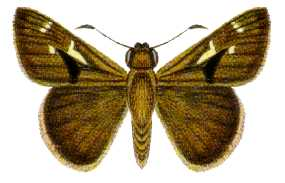

Scientific classification
- Kingdom: Animalia
- Phylum: Arthropoda
- Class: Insecta
- Order: Lepidoptera
- Family: Hesperiidae
- Subfamily: Trapezitinae
- Genus: Timoconia
- Species: T. peron

Binomial name
- Timoconia peron (Latreille, [1824])

Synonyms
- Toxidia peron (Latreille, 1824); Hesperia peron Latreille, 1824; Telesto kochii Felder, 1862; Hesperilla doclea Hewitson, 1868; Telesto arsenia Plötz, 1884; Timoconia thielei Strand, 1909

= Timoconia peron =

Species of butterfly

Timoconia peron, the large dingy skipper or dingy grass-skipper, is a butterfly of the family Hesperiidae. It is found in the Australian Capital Territory, New South Wales, Queensland and Victoria.

The wingspan is about 30 mm.

The larvae feed on Stenotaphrum secundatum, Gahnia sieberiana, Lomandra species, Dianella caerulea and other Dianella species.
