= Rachelia =

Rachelia is the scientific name of two genera of organisms and may refer to:

- Rachelia (butterfly), a genus of insects in the family Hesperiidae
- Rachelia (plant), a genus of plants in the family Asteraceae
