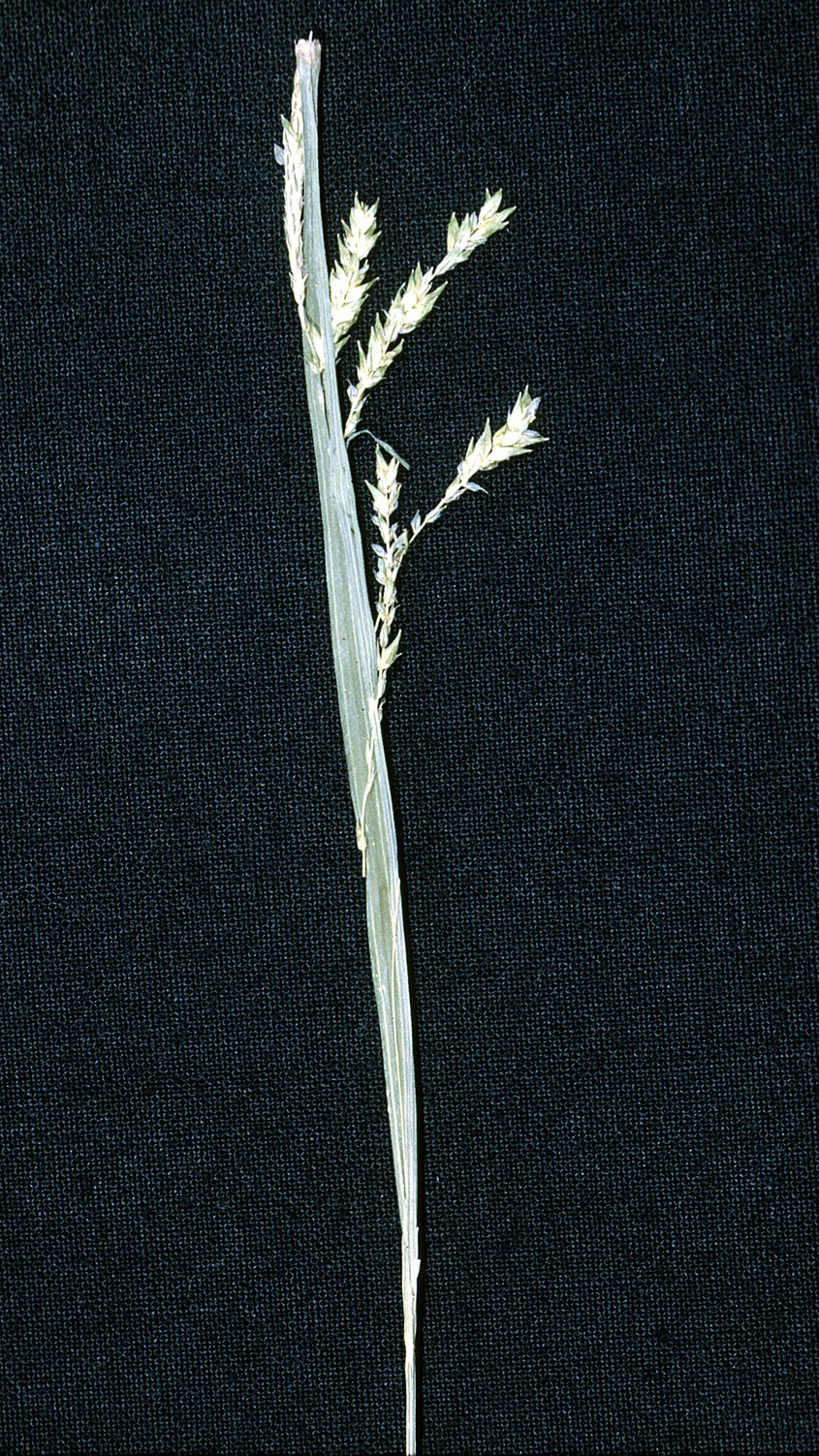
- Photograph provided by USDA NRCS Wetland Science Institute (WSI)

Conservation status
- Least Concern (IUCN 3.1)

Scientific classification
- Kingdom: Plantae
- Clade: Tracheophytes
- Clade: Angiosperms
- Clade: Monocots
- Clade: Commelinids
- Order: Poales
- Family: Cyperaceae
- Genus: Carex
- Species: C. prasina

Binomial name
- Carex prasina Wahlenb.

Synonyms
- Carex miliacea Muhl. ex Willd.; Carex subcompressa Steud.; Olamblis miliacea Raf.

= Carex prasina =

Species of plant

Carex prasina, the drooping sedge (a name it shares with Carex longebrachiata and Carex pendula), is a species of flowering plant in the family Cyperaceae, native to eastern Canada, and the north-central and eastern United States. It is usually found growing in rich soils in deciduous forests, typically in wet places such as streamsides, seeps, springs and fens.
