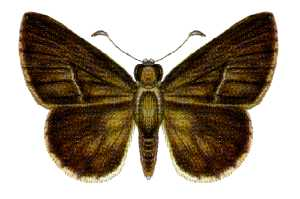

Scientific classification
- Kingdom: Animalia
- Phylum: Arthropoda
- Class: Insecta
- Order: Lepidoptera
- Family: Hesperiidae
- Subfamily: Trapezitinae
- Genus: Timoconia
- Species: T. melania

Binomial name
- Timoconia melania (Waterhouse, 1903)

Synonyms
- Toxidia melania (Waterhouse, 1903); Telesto melania Waterhouse, 1903

= Timoconia melania =

Species of butterfly

Timoconia melania, the black skipper or dark grass-skipper, is a butterfly of the family Hesperiidae. It is endemic to the rainforests of tropical Queensland, Australia.

The wingspan is about 30 mm.

The larvae feed on Poaceae species.
