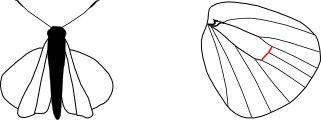
- Illustration of resting position (left) and hindwing venation (right)

Scientific classification
- Kingdom: Animalia
- Phylum: Arthropoda
- Class: Insecta
- Order: Lepidoptera
- Family: Hesperiidae
- Subfamily: Trapezitinae

Genera
- See text

= Trapezitinae =

- Trapezites symmomus

Subfamily of butterflies

Trapezitinae is a subfamily of the Hesperiidae ("skippers") family of butterflies. They are found only in New Guinea and Australia. The subfamily contains about 60 species in 20 genera.

== Genera ==
- Anisynta Lower, 1911
- Atkinsia Braby & Toussaint, 2022
- Antipodia Atkins, 1984
- Croitana Waterhouse, 1932
- Dispar Waterhouse & Lyell, 1914
- Felicena Waterhouse, 1932
- Herimosa Atkins, 1994
- Hesperilla Hewitson, 1868
- Hewitsoniella Shepard, 1931
- Mesodina Meyrick, 1901
- Motasingha Watson, 1893
- Neohesperilla Waterhouse & Lyell, 1914
- Oreisplanus Waterhouse & Lyell, 1914
- Pasma Waterhouse, 1932
- Prada Evans, 1949
- Proeidosa Atkins, 1973
- Signeta Waterhouse & Lyell, 1914
- Rachelia Hemming, 1964
- Toxidia Mabille, 1891
- Trapezites Hübner, 1819
