= Atkinsia =

Atkinsia may refer to:

- Atkinsia (butterfly), a genus of insects in the family Hesperiidae
- Atkinsia (plant), a genus of plants in the family Malvaceae
