= N. crocea =

N. crocea may refer to:

- Neohesperilla crocea, an Oceanian butterfly
- Nephrotoma crocea, a crane fly
- Nereis crocea, a polychaete worm
- Noumea crocea, a sea slug
