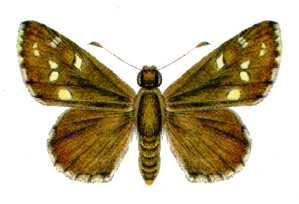

Scientific classification
- Kingdom: Animalia
- Phylum: Arthropoda
- Class: Insecta
- Order: Lepidoptera
- Family: Hesperiidae
- Genus: Proeidosa
- Species: P. polysema

Binomial name
- Proeidosa polysema (Lower, 1908)

Synonyms
- Hesperilla polysema Lower, 1908

= Proeidosa polysema =

Species of butterfly

Proeidosa polysema, the polysema skipper or spinifex sand-skipper, is a butterfly of the family Hesperiidae. It is found in Australia in the Northern Territory, Queensland and Western Australia.

The wingspan is about 30 mm (1.2 in).

The larvae feed on Triodia species, including Triodia microstachya, Triodia pungens and Triodia mitchellii.
