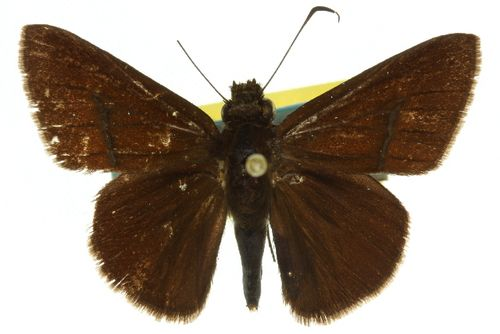

Scientific classification
- Kingdom: Animalia
- Phylum: Arthropoda
- Class: Insecta
- Order: Lepidoptera
- Family: Hesperiidae
- Genus: Toxidia
- Species: T. inornatus

Binomial name
- Toxidia inornatus (Butler, 1883)

Synonyms
- Toxidia inornatus (Butler, 1883); Thanaos inornatus Butler, 1883; Hesperia maykora Plötz, 1885; Telesto uniformis Swinhoe, 1905; Toxidia damora Fruhstorfer, 1911

= Toxidia inornata =

Species of butterfly

Toxidia inornata, is a butterfly of the family Hesperiidae. The common name for this species is spotless grass-skipper or inornata skipper. It is found in Indonesia (Papua, Aru Islands, Kai Islands), New Guinea, Australia's Cape York and surrounding islands.

The wingspan is about 25 mm. The larvae feed on Poaceae species, including Brachiaria reptans. They live in the debris at the foot of its host plant or in a shelter of leaves joined with silk.

== Subspecies ==
- Toxidia inornata inornata (Butler, 1883) (Aru Islands, Kei Islands, Queensland)
- Toxidia inornata sekara (Plötz, 1885) (New Guinea)
- ?Toxidia inornata anga Evans 1949
