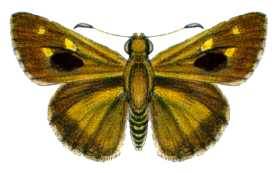

Scientific classification
- Kingdom: Animalia
- Phylum: Arthropoda
- Class: Insecta
- Order: Lepidoptera
- Family: Hesperiidae
- Genus: Timoconia
- Species: T. flammeata

Binomial name
- Timoconia flammeata (Butler, 1882)

Synonyms
- Signeta flammeata (Butler, 1882); Telesto flammeata Butler, 1882; Telesto eclipsis Butler, 1882; Hesperilla atromacula Miskin, 1889

= Timoconia flammeata =

Species of butterfly

Timoconia flammeata, the bright shield-skipper, is a butterfly of the family Hesperiidae. It is found in the Australian Capital Territory, New South Wales, Queensland, South Australia and Victoria.

The wingspan is about 30 mm.

The larvae feed on Poa tenera, Tetrarrhena juncea and other Tetrarrhena species.
