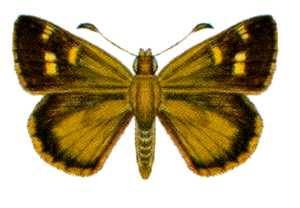

Scientific classification
- Kingdom: Animalia
- Phylum: Arthropoda
- Class: Insecta
- Order: Lepidoptera
- Family: Hesperiidae
- Genus: Anisynta
- Species: A. sphenosema

Binomial name
- Anisynta sphenosema Meyrick & Lower, 1902

Synonyms
- Trapezites sphenosema; Trapezites paraphaes

= Anisynta sphenosema =

Species of butterfly

Anisynta sphenosema, the wedge grass-skipper or wedge skipper, is a species of butterfly of the family Hesperiidae. It is found in the south-west quarter of Australia.

The wingspan is about 30 mm.

The larvae feed on various grasses, including Microlaena stipoides, Ehrharta calycina and Ehrharta longiflora.
