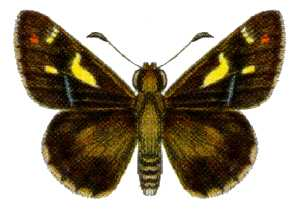

Scientific classification
- Kingdom: Animalia
- Phylum: Arthropoda
- Class: Insecta
- Order: Lepidoptera
- Family: Hesperiidae
- Genus: Toxidia
- Species: T. doubledayi

Binomial name
- Toxidia doubledayi (Felder, 1862)

Synonyms
- Telesto doubledayi Felder, 1862; Telesto leachii C. Felder, 1862; Carystus vallio Mabille, 1883

= Toxidia doubledayi =

Species of butterfly

Toxidia doubledayi, the Doubleday's skipper or lilac grass-skipper, is a butterfly of the family Hesperiidae. It is found in the mountains and on the coastal plain of the east coast of Australia, including New South Wales and Queensland.

The wingspan is about 30 mm.

The larvae feed on Oplismenus species.
