= Felicena dirpha =

Scientific classification
- Kingdom: Animalia
- Phylum: Arthropoda
- Class: Insecta
- Order: Lepidoptera
- Family: Hesperiidae
- Genus: Felicena
- Species: F. dirpha

Binomial name
- Felicena dirpha Boisduval, 1832

Synonyms
- Felicena phalos Boisduval, 1832; Thymele dirpha Boisduval, 1832

Species of butterfly

Felicena dirpha is a butterfly of the family Hesperiidae. It is found in New Guinea.

== Subspecies ==
- Felicena dirpha dirpha
- Felicena dirpha albicilla (Joicey & Talbot, 1917) (New Guinea)
- Felicena dirpha nota Evans, 1949
