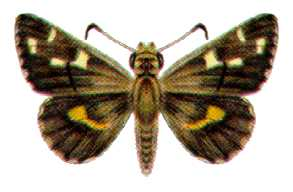

Scientific classification
- Kingdom: Animalia
- Phylum: Arthropoda
- Class: Insecta
- Order: Lepidoptera
- Family: Hesperiidae
- Genus: Hesperilla
- Species: H. crypsigramma

Binomial name
- Hesperilla crypsigramma (Meyrick & Lower 1902)

Synonyms
- Telesto crypsigramma Meyrick & Lower, 1902

= Hesperilla crypsigramma =

Species of butterfly

Hesperilla crypsigramma, also known as the small dingy skipper or wide-brand sedge-skipper, is a species of butterfly in the family Hesperiidae. It is found in Australia in New South Wales, Northern Territory and Queensland.

The wingspan is about 25 mm.

The larvae feed on various sedges, including Scleria sphacelata and Scleria mackaviensis.
