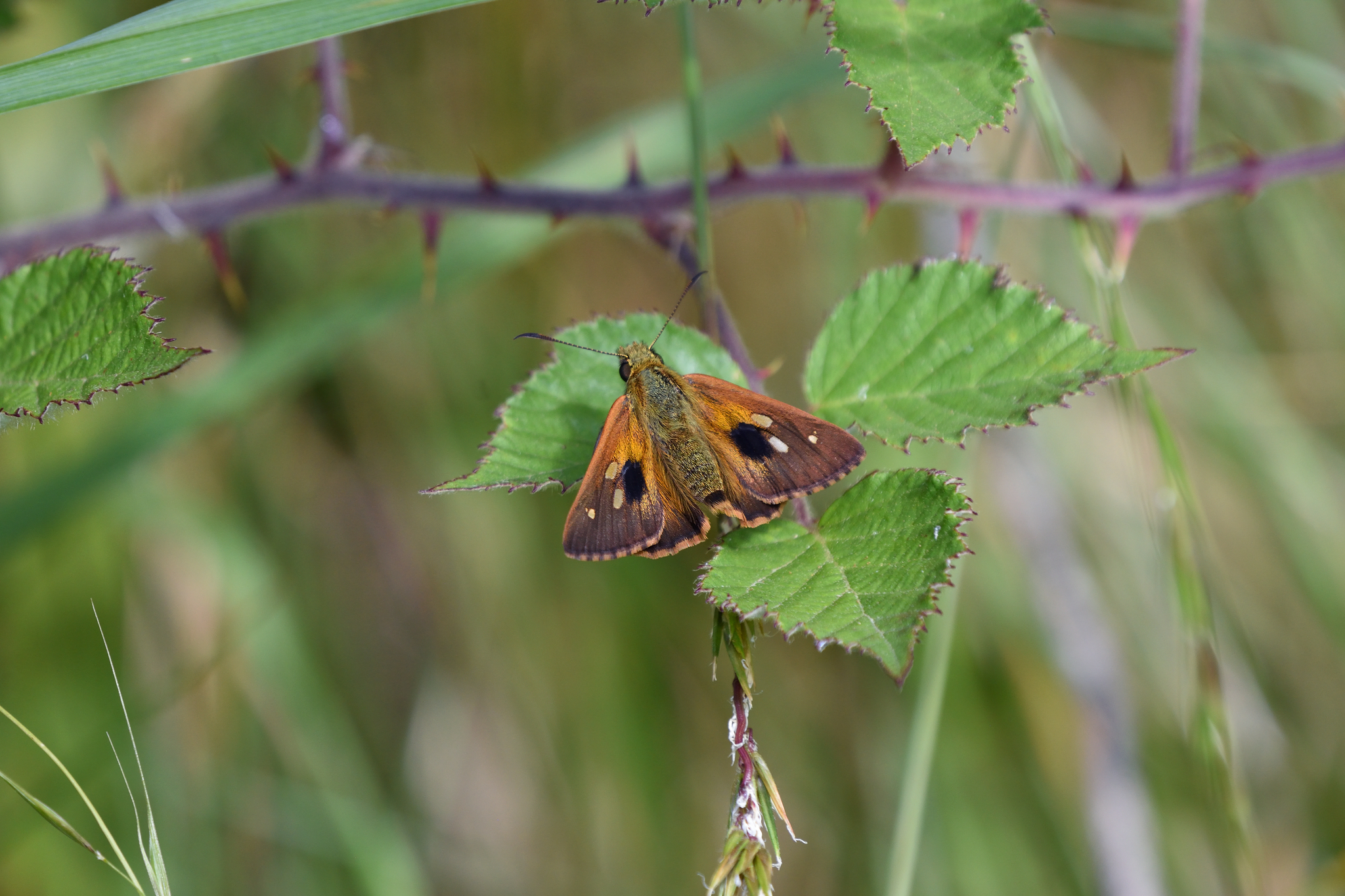
- Timoconia flammeata, Australia

Scientific classification
- Kingdom: Animalia
- Phylum: Arthropoda
- Class: Insecta
- Order: Lepidoptera
- Family: Hesperiidae
- Subfamily: Trapezitinae
- Genus: Timoconia; Strand, 1909

Synonyms
- Signeta

= Timoconia =

Genus of butterflies

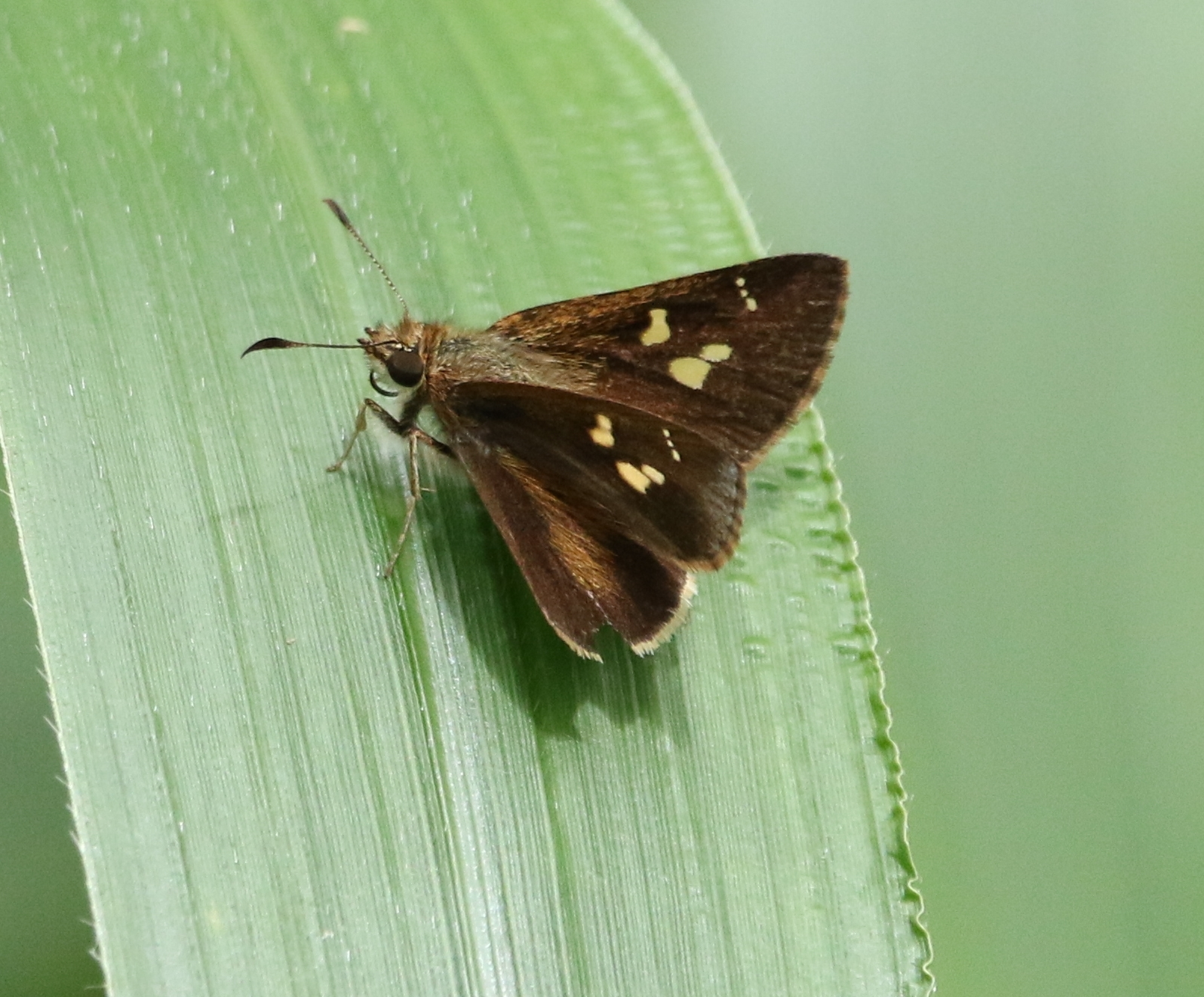
Timoconia peron, Australia

Timoconia is a genus of shield-skippers in the butterfly family Hesperiidae. There are at least four described species in Timoconia, found in Australia.

== Species ==
These four species belong to the genus Timoconia:

- Timoconia flammeata (Butler, 1882) (bright shield-skipper)
- Timoconia melania (Waterhouse, 1903) (dark grass-skipper)
- Timoconia peron Latreille, 1824 (large dingy skipper)
- Timoconia tymbophora (Meyrick & Lower, 1902) (dark shield-skipper)
