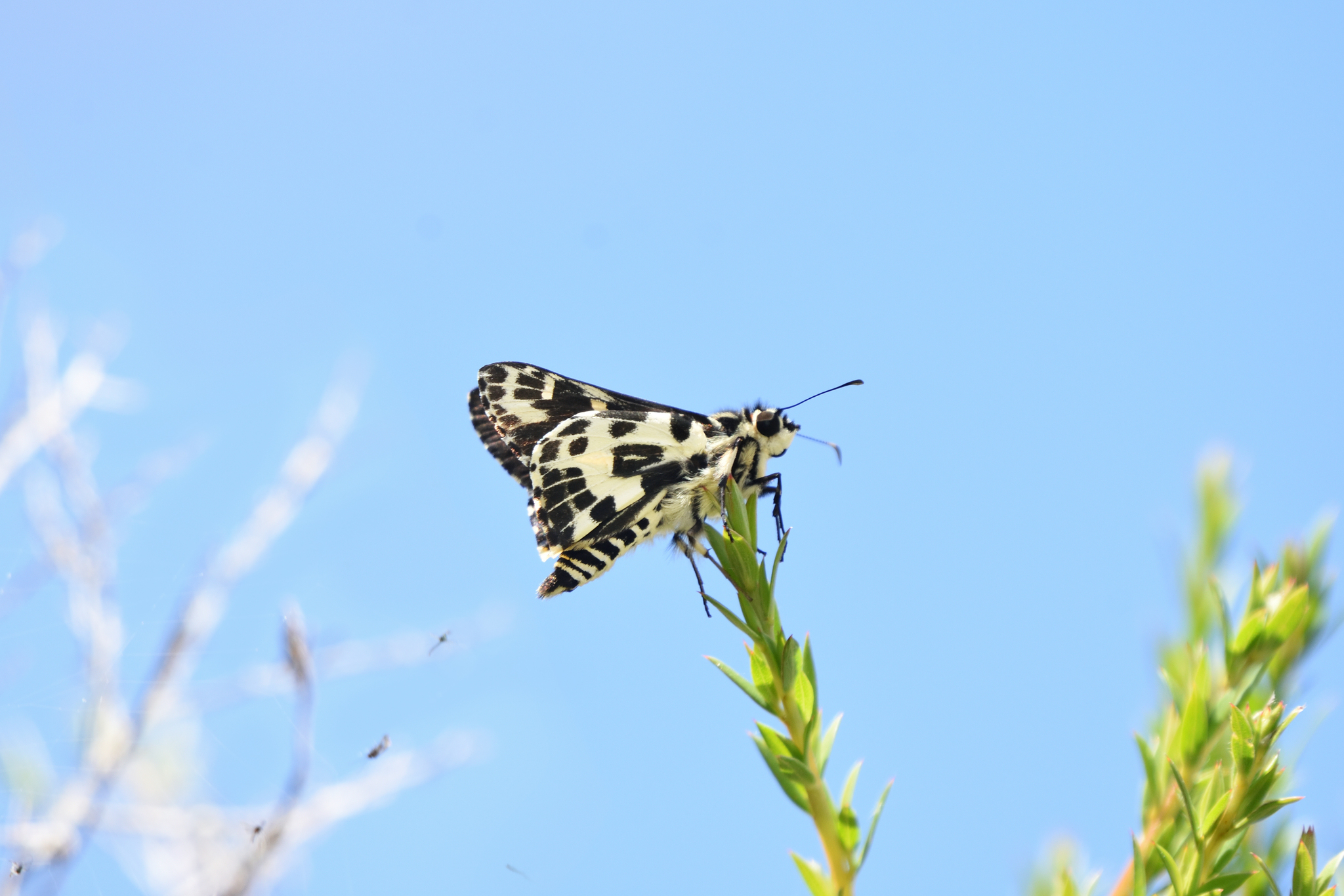
- Hesperilla ornata, Australia

Scientific classification
- Kingdom: Animalia
- Phylum: Arthropoda
- Class: Insecta
- Order: Lepidoptera
- Family: Hesperiidae
- Subfamily: Trapezitinae
- Genus: Hesperilla; Hewitson, 1868

= Hesperilla =

Genus of butterflies

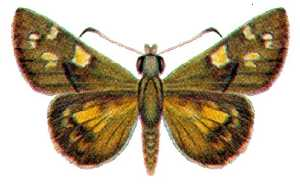
Antipodia chaostola

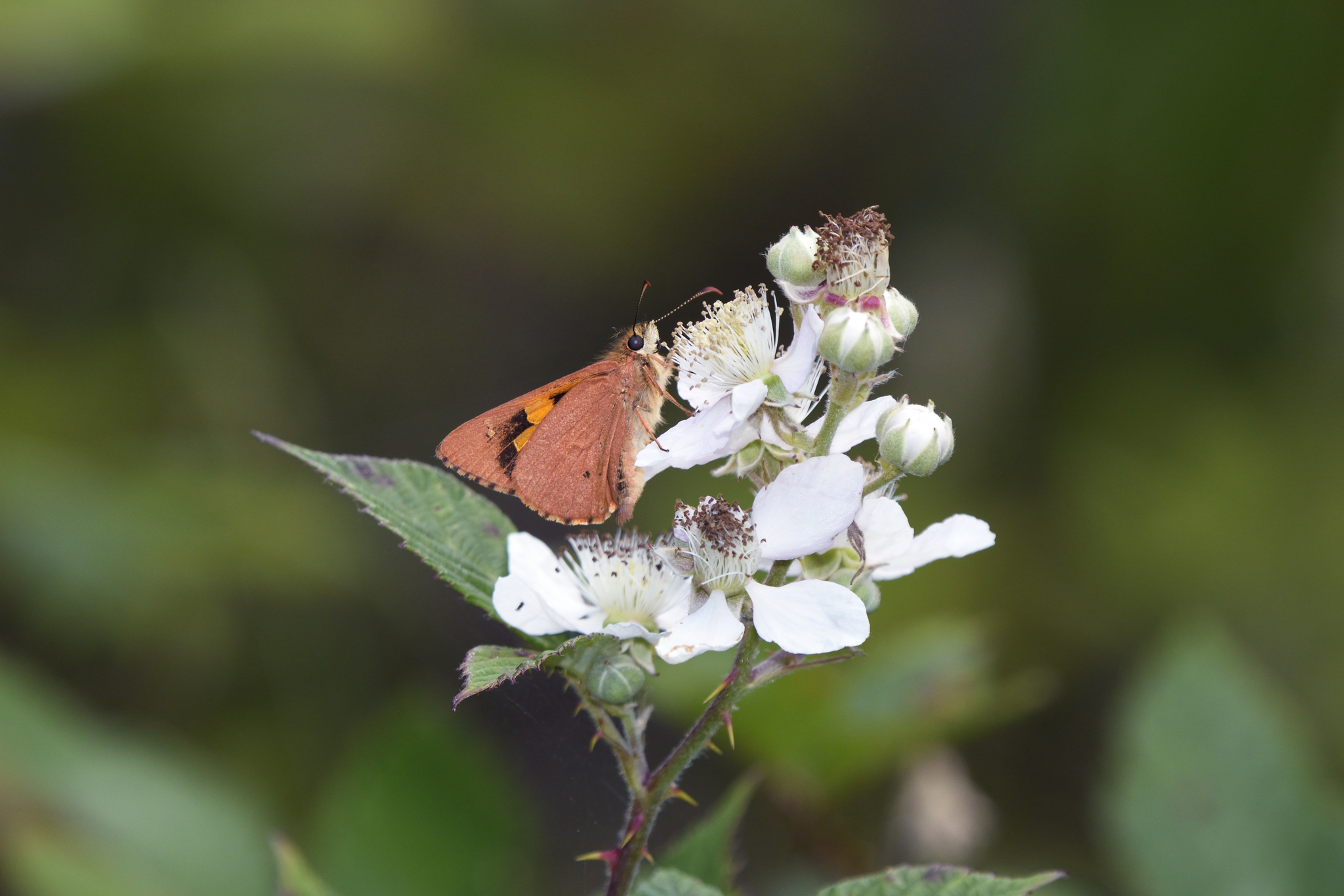
Hesperilla idothea, Australia

Hesperilla is a genus of skipper butterflies in the family Hesperiidae, found throughout most of Australia.

As a result of research published in 2022, the species of the genera Motasingha and Oreisplanus were transferred to Hesperilla.

== Species ==
The genus includes the following species:

- Hesperilla chrysotricha Meyrick & Lower, 1902
- Hesperilla crypsargyra Meyrick, 1888
- Hesperilla crypsigramma (Meyrick & Lower, 1902)
- Hesperilla dirphia Hewitson, 1868
- Hesperilla donnysa Hewitson, 1868
- Hesperilla flavescens Waterhouse, 1927
- Hesperilla furva Sands & Kerr, 1973
- Hesperilla hopsoni Waterhouse, 1927
- Hesperilla idothea Miskin, 1889
- Hesperilla malindeva Lower, 1911
- Hesperilla mastersi Waterhouse, 1900
- Hesperilla munionga Olliff, 1890
- Hesperilla ornata Leach, 1814
- Hesperilla perornata Kirby, 1893
- Hesperilla picta Leach, 1814
- Hesperilla sarnia Atkins, 1978
- Hesperilla sexguttata Herrich-Schäffer, 1869
- Hesperilla trimaculata Tepper, 1882

== Former Species ==
These species were formerly in the genus Hesperilla:

- Hesperilla saxula Mabille, 1891 - synonymized with Halotus angellus Plötz, 1886
- Hesperilla icaria Waterhouse, 1941 - synonymized with Hesperilla donnysa donnysa Hewitson, 1868
- Hesperilla dilata - synonymized with Hesperilla trimaculata dilata (Waterhouse, 1932)
- Hesperilla anapus - synonymized with Antipodia dactyliota (Meyrick, 1888)
