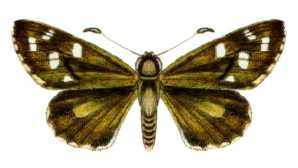

Scientific classification
- Kingdom: Animalia
- Phylum: Arthropoda
- Class: Insecta
- Order: Lepidoptera
- Family: Hesperiidae
- Genus: Antipodia
- Species: A. atralba

Binomial name
- Antipodia atralba Tepper, 1882

Synonyms
- Motasingha atralba; Hesperilla atralba

= Antipodia atralba =

Species of butterfly

Antipodia atralba, the black and white skipper, is a species of butterfly of the family Hesperiidae. It is found in Australia along the coast of Victoria and South Australia.

The wingspan is about 30 mm.

The larvae feed on Cyperaceae species, including Gahnia ancistrophylla, Gahnia deusta and Gahnia lanigera.
