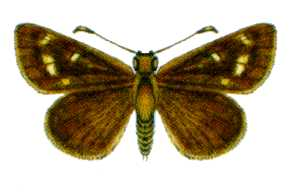

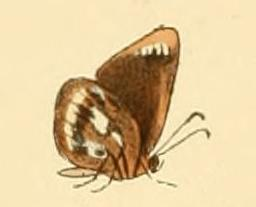

Scientific classification
- Kingdom: Animalia
- Phylum: Arthropoda
- Class: Insecta
- Order: Lepidoptera
- Family: Hesperiidae
- Genus: Anisynta
- Species: A. cynone

Binomial name
- Anisynta cynone Hewitson, 1874

Synonyms
- List: Cyclopides cynone; Hesperilla gracilis; Anisynta grisea; Anisynta gunneda

= Anisynta cynone =

Species of butterfly

Anisynta cynone, the mottled grass-skipper or cynone skipper, is a species of butterfly of the family Hesperiidae. It is found in the Australian states of New South Wales, Victoria and South Australia.

The wingspan is about 20 mm.

The larvae feed on Poa species, such as Poa sieberiana, and Brachypodium distachyon, Cynodon dactylon, Austrostipa scabra and Oryzopsis miliacea.

== Subspecies ==
- Anisynta cynone cynone
- Anisynta cynone gunneda
- Anisynta cynone gracilis
- Anisynta cynone grisea
