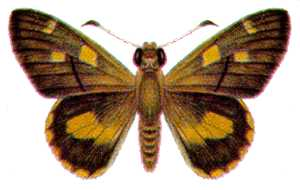

Scientific classification
- Kingdom: Animalia
- Phylum: Arthropoda
- Class: Insecta
- Order: Lepidoptera
- Family: Hesperiidae
- Genus: Hesperilla
- Species: H. mastersi

Binomial name
- Hesperilla mastersi Waterhouse, 1900

Synonyms
- Hesperilla mastersi marakupa Couchman, 1965

= Hesperilla mastersi =

Species of butterfly

Hesperilla mastersi, also known as the chequered sedge-skipper or Master's skipper, is a species of butterfly in the family Hesperiidae. It is found in the Australian states of New South Wales, Queensland and Victoria. It was also found in Tasmania, but the small area where its food plant was growing was cleared to provide cattle pasture. It is probably now extinct in Tasmania.

The wingspan is about 40 mm.
