= Toxidia arfakensis =

Scientific classification
- Kingdom: Animalia
- Phylum: Arthropoda
- Class: Insecta
- Order: Lepidoptera
- Family: Hesperiidae
- Genus: Toxidia
- Species: T. arfakensis

Binomial name
- Toxidia arfakensis Joicey & Talbot, 1917

Species of butterfly

Toxidia arfakensis is a butterfly of the family Hesperiidae. It is found in New Guinea.
