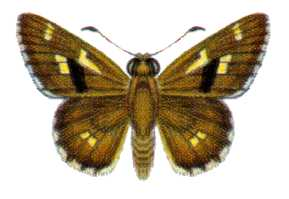

Scientific classification
- Kingdom: Animalia
- Phylum: Arthropoda
- Class: Insecta
- Order: Lepidoptera
- Family: Hesperiidae
- Genus: Neohesperilla
- Species: N. xiphiphora

Binomial name
- Neohesperilla xiphiphora Lower, 1911

Synonyms
- Hesperilla xiphiphora

= Neohesperilla xiphiphora =

Species of butterfly

Neohesperilla xiphiphora, the xiphiphora skipper, is a butterfly of the family Hesperiidae. It is found in the Northern Territory and Cape York of Australia.

The wingspan is about 30 mm.

The larvae feed on Schizachyrium perplexum.
