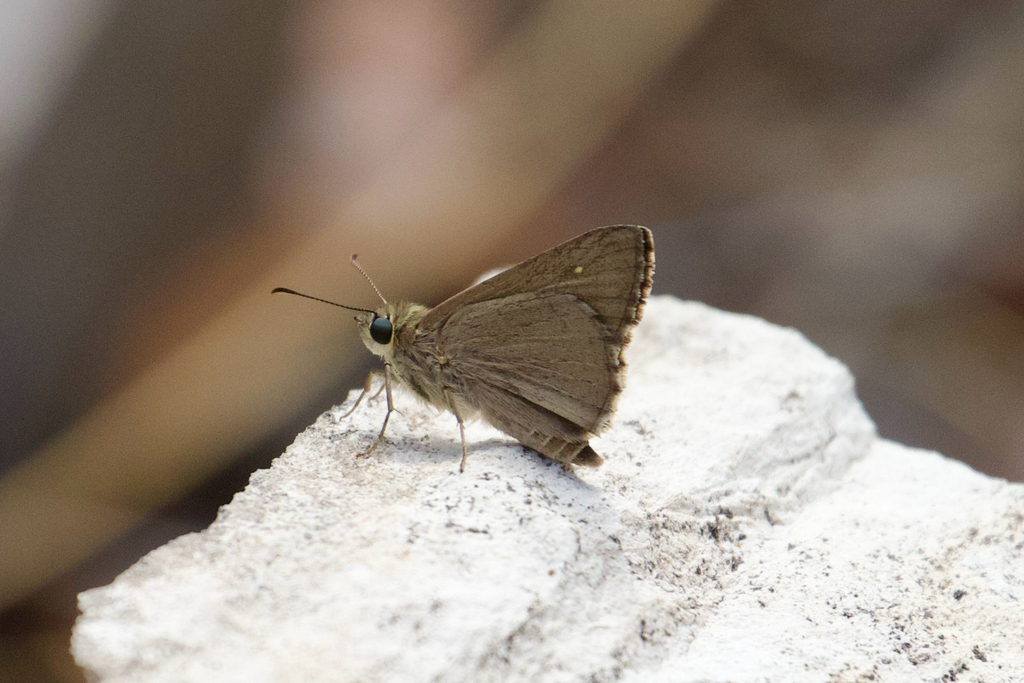

Scientific classification
- Kingdom: Animalia
- Phylum: Arthropoda
- Class: Insecta
- Order: Lepidoptera
- Family: Hesperiidae
- Genus: Hesperilla
- Species: H. furva

Binomial name
- Hesperilla furva Sands & Kerr, 1973

= Hesperilla furva =

Species of butterfly

Hesperilla furva, commonly known as the grey sedge-skipper, is a species of butterfly in the family Hesperiidae. It is endemic to Queensland, Australia.

The wingspan is about 30 mm.

The larvae feed on Scleria sphacelata and Scleria mackaviensis. They create a shelter with leaves of their host. Pupation takes place inside this shelter.
