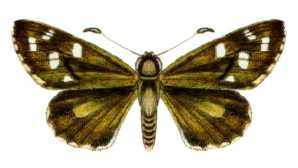
- Antipodia atralba

Scientific classification
- Kingdom: Animalia
- Phylum: Arthropoda
- Class: Insecta
- Order: Lepidoptera
- Family: Hesperiidae
- Subfamily: Trapezitinae
- Genus: Antipodia; Atkins, 1984

= Antipodia =

Genus of butterflies

Antipodia is a genus of skipper butterflies in the family Hesperiidae.

== Species ==
- Antipodia atralba Tepper, 1882
- Antipodia chaostola Meyrick, 1888
- Antipodia dactyliota Meyrick, 1888
