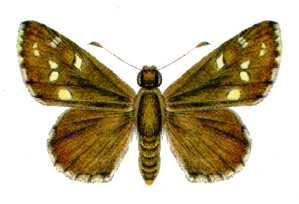
- Proeidosa polysema

Scientific classification
- Kingdom: Animalia
- Phylum: Arthropoda
- Class: Insecta
- Order: Lepidoptera
- Family: Hesperiidae
- Subfamily: Trapezitinae
- Genus: Proeidosa; Atkins, 1973

= Proeidosa =

Genus of butterflies

Proeidosa is a genus of skipper butterflies in the family Hesperiidae.

== Species ==
- Proeidosa polysema Lower, 1908
