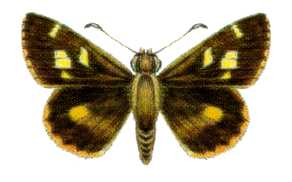
- Dispar compacta

Scientific classification
- Kingdom: Animalia
- Phylum: Arthropoda
- Class: Insecta
- Order: Lepidoptera
- Family: Hesperiidae
- Subfamily: Trapezitinae
- Genus: Dispar; Waterhouse & Lyell, 1914

= Dispar =

Genus of butterflies

Dispar is a genus of skipper butterflies in the family Hesperiidae.

== Species ==
- Dispar compacta Butler, 1882
