= Felicena =

Scientific classification
- Kingdom: Animalia
- Phylum: Arthropoda
- Class: Insecta
- Order: Lepidoptera
- Family: Hesperiidae
- Subfamily: Trapezitinae
- Genus: Felicena; Waterhouse, 1932

Genus of butterflies

Felicena is a genus of skipper butterflies in the family Hesperiidae.

== Species ==
- Felicena dirpha Boisduval, 1832
- Felicena dora Evans, 1949
