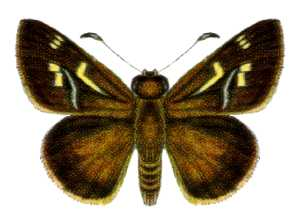

Scientific classification
- Kingdom: Animalia
- Phylum: Arthropoda
- Class: Insecta
- Order: Lepidoptera
- Family: Hesperiidae
- Genus: Toxidia
- Species: T. rietmanni

Binomial name
- Toxidia rietmanni (Semper, [1879])

Synonyms
- Hesperilla rietmanni Semper, [1879]; Telesto extranea Plötz, 1884; Telesto leucostigma Meyrick & Lower, 1902; Toxidia parasema Lower, 1908; Hesperilla leucostigma parasema Lower, 1908

= Toxidia rietmanni =

Species of butterfly

Toxidia rietmanni, the white-brand skipper or whitebranded grass-skipper, is a butterfly of the family Hesperiidae. It is found in the Australian states of New South Wales and Queensland.

The wingspan is about 25 mm.

== Subspecies ==
- Toxidia rietmanni parasema (Lower, 1908) (northern Queensland)
- Toxidia rietmanni rietmanni (Semper, 1879) (southern Queensland and in New South Wales)
