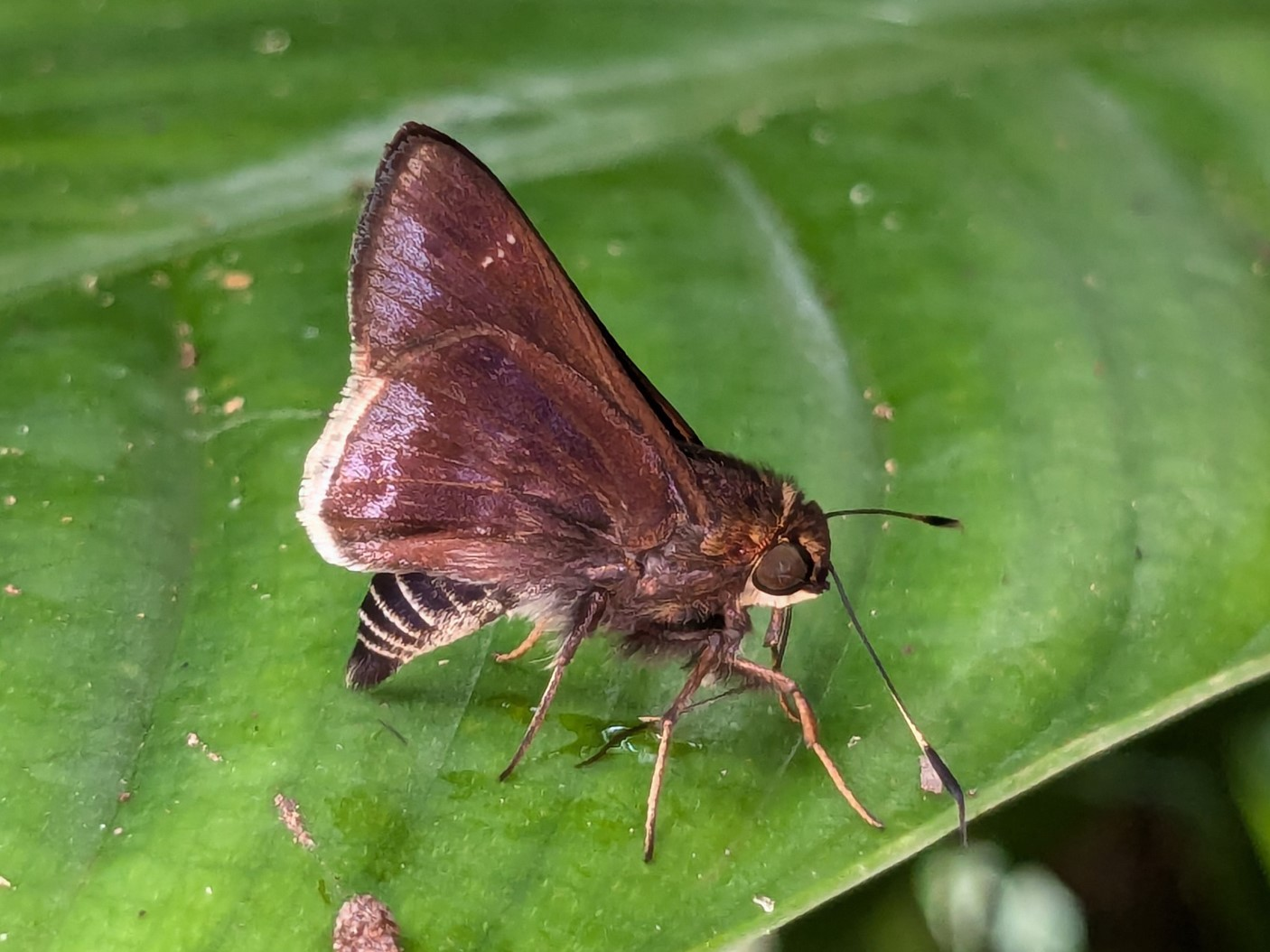

Scientific classification
- Kingdom: Animalia
- Phylum: Arthropoda
- Class: Insecta
- Order: Lepidoptera
- Family: Hesperiidae
- Genus: Felicena
- Species: F. dora

Binomial name
- Felicena dora Evans, 1949

= Felicena dora =

Species of butterfly

Felicena dora is a species of butterfly in the family Hesperiidae. It is found in New Guinea.
