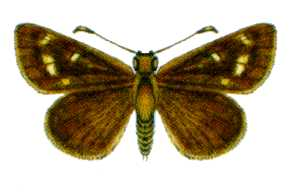
- Anisynta cynone

Scientific classification
- Kingdom: Animalia
- Phylum: Arthropoda
- Class: Insecta
- Order: Lepidoptera
- Family: Hesperiidae
- Subfamily: Trapezitinae
- Genus: Anisynta; Lower, 1911

= Anisynta =

Genus of butterflies

Anisynta is a genus of butterflies in the family Hesperiidae (subfamily Trapezitinae). The species of the genus Anisynta are found in the Australasian realm.

== Species ==
- Anisynta sphenosema Meyrick & Lower, 1902
- Anisynta cynone Hewitson, 1874
- Anisynta tillyardi Waterhouse & Lyell, 1912
- Anisynta monticolae Olliff, 1890
- Anisynta dominula Plötz, 1884
