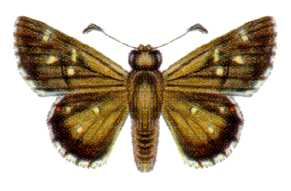

Scientific classification
- Kingdom: Animalia
- Phylum: Arthropoda
- Class: Insecta
- Order: Lepidoptera
- Family: Hesperiidae
- Genus: Neohesperilla
- Species: N. senta

Binomial name
- Neohesperilla senta Miskin, 1891

Synonyms
- Hesperilla senta

= Neohesperilla senta =

Species of butterfly

Neohesperilla senta, the senta skipper, is a butterfly of the family Hesperiidae. It is found across the tropical north of Australia, including Western Australia, the Northern Territory and Queensland.

The wingspan is about 25 mm.

The larvae feed on Themeda triandra.
