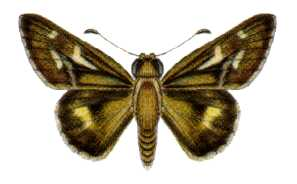

Scientific classification
- Kingdom: Animalia
- Phylum: Arthropoda
- Class: Insecta
- Order: Lepidoptera
- Family: Hesperiidae
- Genus: Neohesperilla
- Species: N. xanthomera

Binomial name
- Neohesperilla xanthomera Meyrick & Lower, 1902

Synonyms
- Telesto xanthomera

= Neohesperilla xanthomera =

Species of butterfly

Neohesperilla xanthomera, the xanthomera skipper, is a butterfly of the family Hesperiidae. It is found in Australia in the Northern Territory, Queensland and New South Wales.

The wingspan is about 30 mm.

The larvae feed on Heteropogon.
