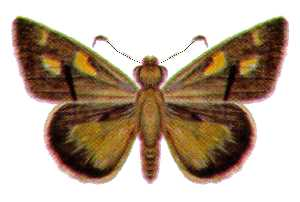

Scientific classification
- Kingdom: Animalia
- Phylum: Arthropoda
- Class: Insecta
- Order: Lepidoptera
- Family: Hesperiidae
- Genus: Toxidia
- Species: T. andersoni

Binomial name
- Toxidia andersoni (Kirby, 1893)

Synonyms
- Trapezites andersoni Kirby, 1893

= Toxidia andersoni =

Species of butterfly

Toxidia andersoni, Anderson's skipper or the southern grass-skipper, is a butterfly of the family Hesperiidae. It is found in Australia in inland New South Wales, Queensland and Victoria.

The wingspan is about 20 mm.

The larvae feed on Poa queenslandica and Tetrarrhena juncea.
