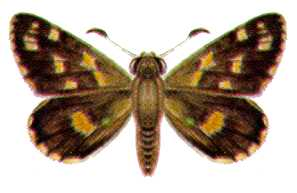

Scientific classification
- Kingdom: Animalia
- Phylum: Arthropoda
- Class: Insecta
- Order: Lepidoptera
- Family: Hesperiidae
- Genus: Hesperilla
- Species: H. munionga

Binomial name
- Hesperilla munionga (Olliff, 1890)

Synonyms
- Oreisplanus munionga Olliff, 1890

= Hesperilla munionga =

Species of butterfly

Hesperilla munionga, the alpine sedge-skipper, is a butterfly of the family Hesperiidae. It is found in the Australian Capital Territory, New South Wales, Tasmania and Victoria.

The wingspan is about 30 mm.

The larvae feed on Carex species (including Carex appressa and Carex longebrachiata) and Scirpus polystachyus.

== Subspecies ==
- Hesperilla munionga larana Couchman, 1962 (north-west coast of Tasmania)
- Hesperilla munionga munionga (Olliff, 1890) - alpine skipper (mountains of New South Wales and Victoria)
