= Hesperilla hopsoni =

Scientific classification
- Kingdom: Animalia
- Phylum: Arthropoda
- Clade: Pancrustacea
- Class: Insecta
- Order: Lepidoptera
- Family: Hesperiidae
- Genus: Hesperilla
- Species: H. hopsoni

Binomial name
- Hesperilla hopsoni Waterhouse, 1927

Species of butterfly

Hesperilla hopsoni, the golden sedge-skipper, is a species of skipper in the butterfly family Hesperiidae. It is found in eastern Australia.
