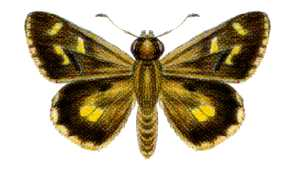

Scientific classification
- Kingdom: Animalia
- Phylum: Arthropoda
- Class: Insecta
- Order: Lepidoptera
- Family: Hesperiidae
- Genus: Anisynta
- Species: A. monticolae

Binomial name
- Anisynta monticolae Olliff, 1890

Synonyms
- Hesperilla monticolae

= Anisynta monticolae =

Species of butterfly

Anisynta monticolae, the montane grass-skipper or mountain skipper, is a species of butterfly in the family Hesperiidae. It is found in Australia from the mountains of New South Wales and Victoria.

The wingspan is about 20 mm.

The larvae feed on Poaceae species.
