= Prada (skipper) =

Scientific classification
- Kingdom: Animalia
- Phylum: Arthropoda
- Class: Insecta
- Order: Lepidoptera
- Family: Hesperiidae
- Subfamily: Trapezitinae
- Genus: Prada; Evans, 1949

Genus of butterflies

Prada is a genus of skippers in the family Hesperiidae.

== Species ==
Recognised species in the genus Prada include:

- Prada papua Evans, 1938
- Prada rawlinsonia Evans, 1949
- Prada rothschildi Evans, 1928
