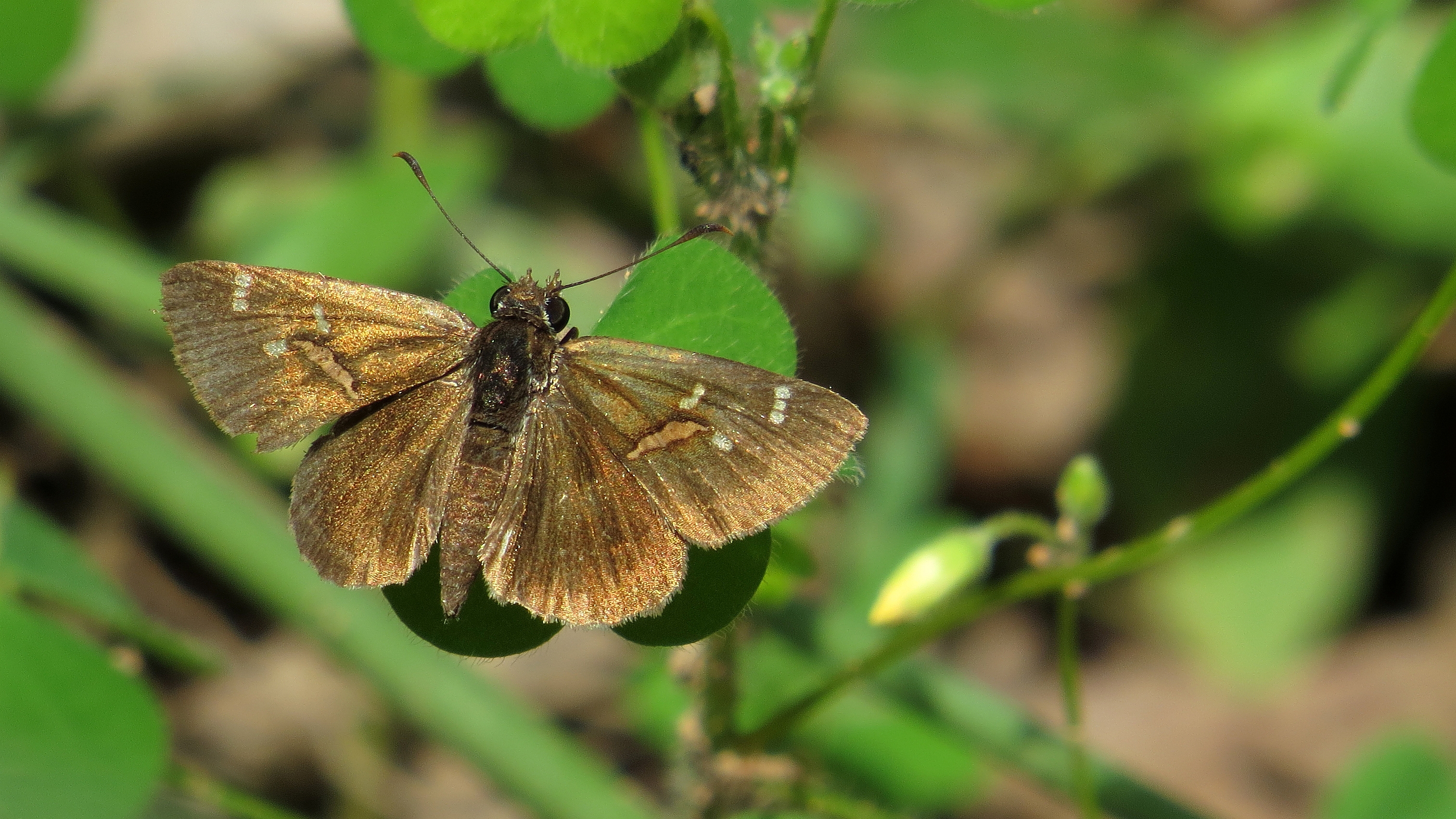
- Toxidia parvula, male

Scientific classification
- Kingdom: Animalia
- Phylum: Arthropoda
- Class: Insecta
- Order: Lepidoptera
- Family: Hesperiidae
- Subfamily: Trapezitinae
- Genus: Toxidia; Mabille, 1891

= Toxidia =

Genus of butterflies

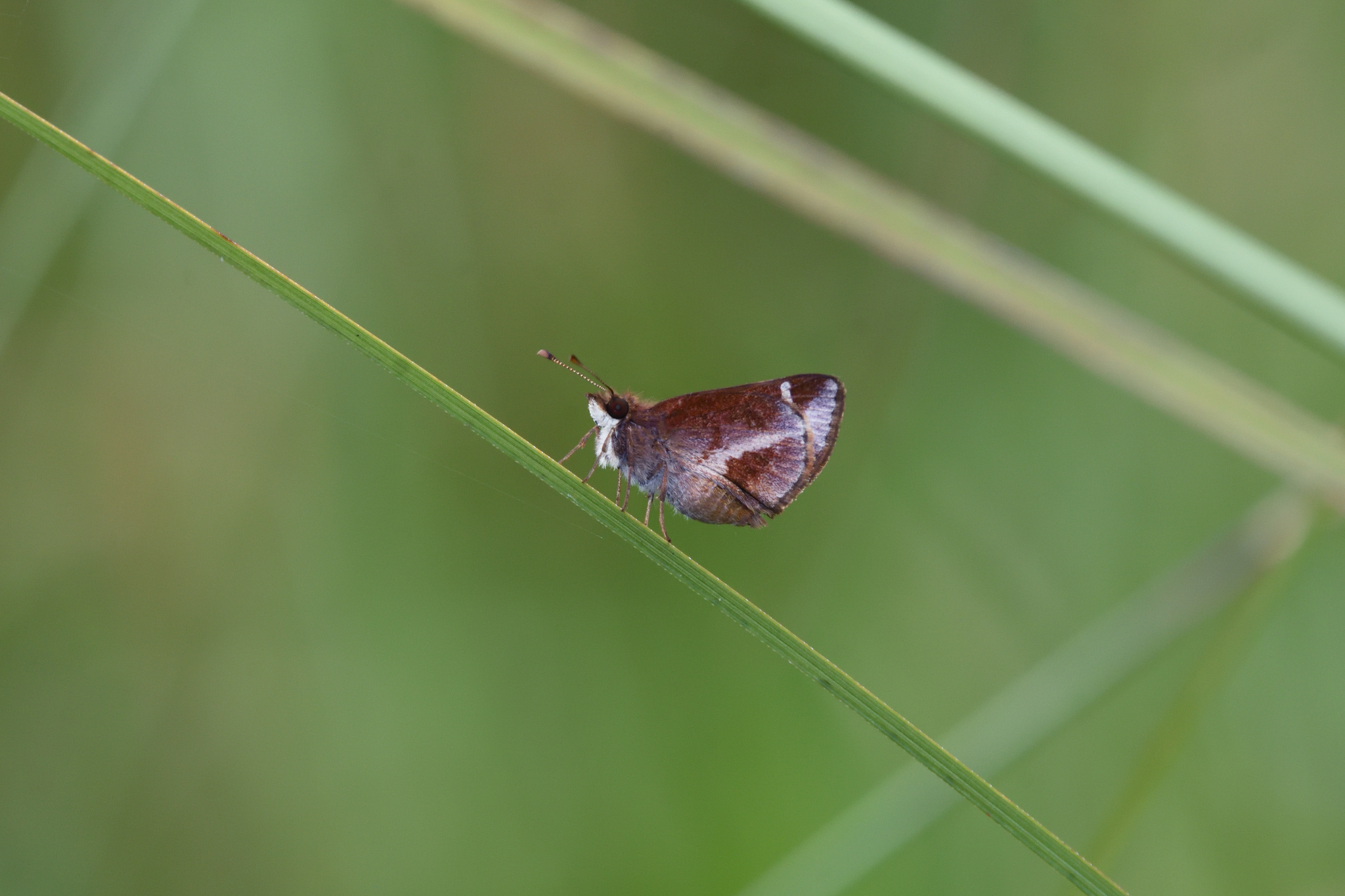
Toxidia doubledayi, Australia

Toxidia is a genus of butterflies in the subfamily Trapezitinae of family Hesperiidae. The contained species are found in the Australasian realm.

== Species ==
The genus includes the following species:

- Toxidia andersoni (Kirby, 1893) (southern grass-skipper)
- Toxidia arfakensis (Joicey & Talbot, 1917)
- Toxidia crocea (Miskin, 1889) (narrow-brand grass-skipper)
- Toxidia doubledayi Felder, 1862 (lilac grass-skipper)
- Toxidia inornata (Butler, 1883) (spotless grass-skipper)
- Toxidia parvula Plötz, 1884 (banded grass-skipper)
- Toxidia rietmanni (Semper, 1879) (white-brand grass-skipper)
- Toxidia senta (Miskin, 1891) (senta skipper)
- Toxidia thyrrhus Mabille, 1891 (dusky grass-skipper)
- Toxidia xanthomera (Meyrick & Lower, 1902) (yellow grass-skipper)
- Toxidia xiphiphora (Lower, 1911) (sword-brand grass-skipper)
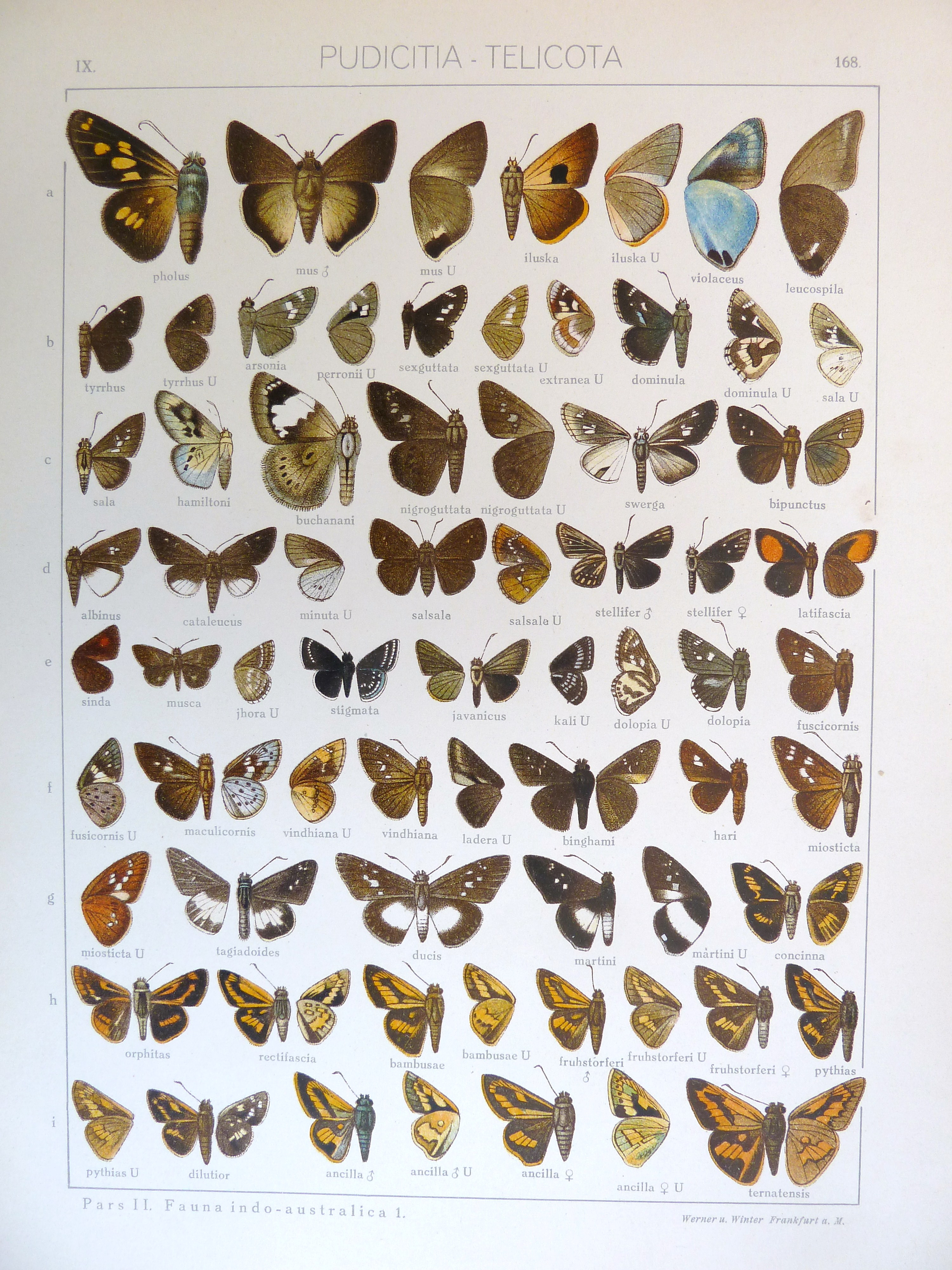
Toxidia in Seitz
