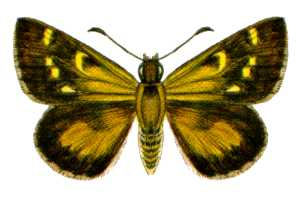

Scientific classification
- Kingdom: Animalia
- Phylum: Arthropoda
- Class: Insecta
- Order: Lepidoptera
- Family: Hesperiidae
- Genus: Anisynta
- Species: A. tillyardi

Binomial name
- Anisynta tillyardi Waterhouse & Lyell, 1912

= Anisynta tillyardi =

Species of butterfly

Anisynta tillyardi, the chequered grass-skipper or Tillyard's skipper, is a species of butterfly in the family Hesperiidae. It is found in Australia in the Dividing Range, at heights of over 1,000 metres in southern Queensland and northern New South Wales.

The wingspan is about 30 mm.

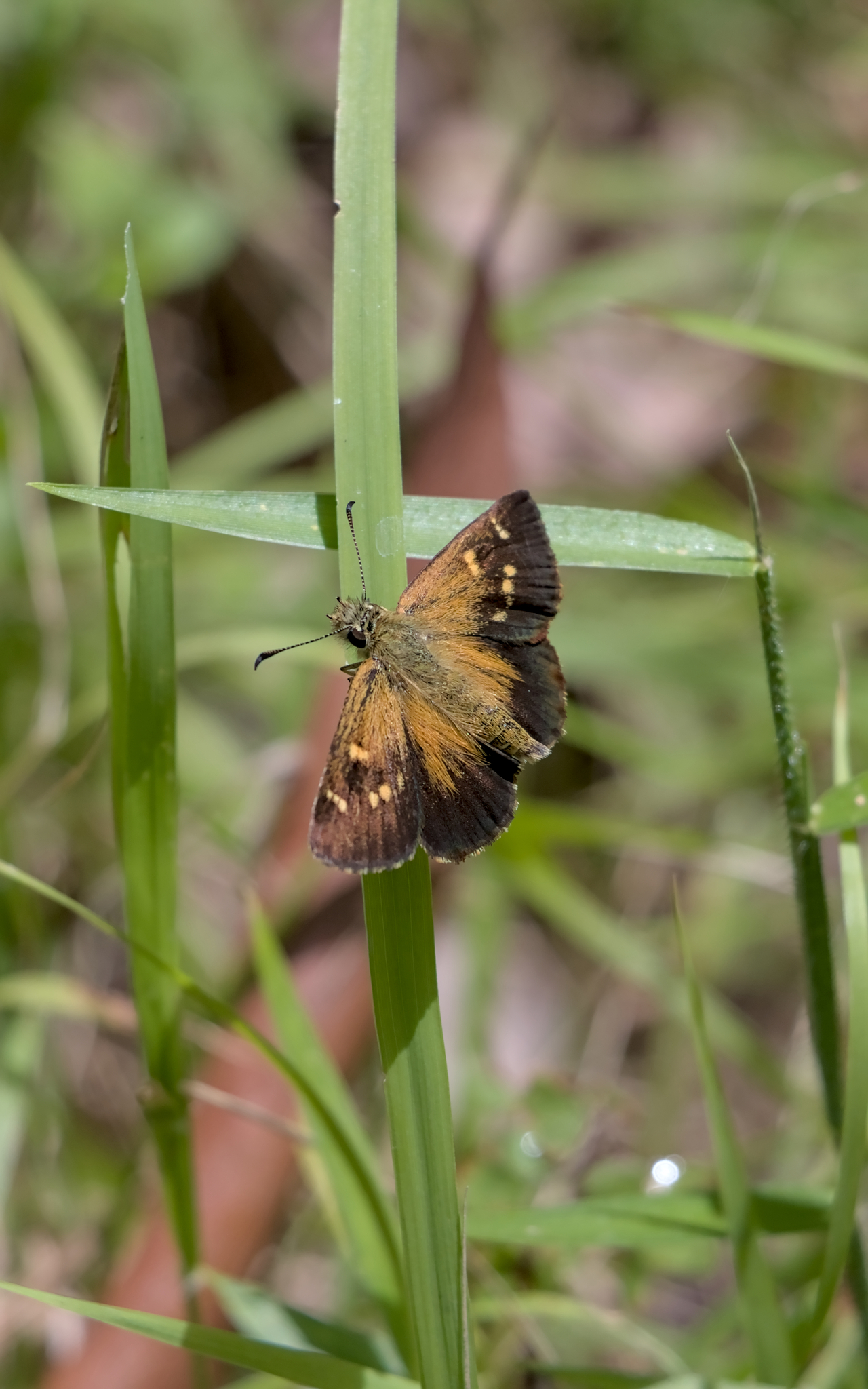

The larvae feed on Poa labillardieri.
