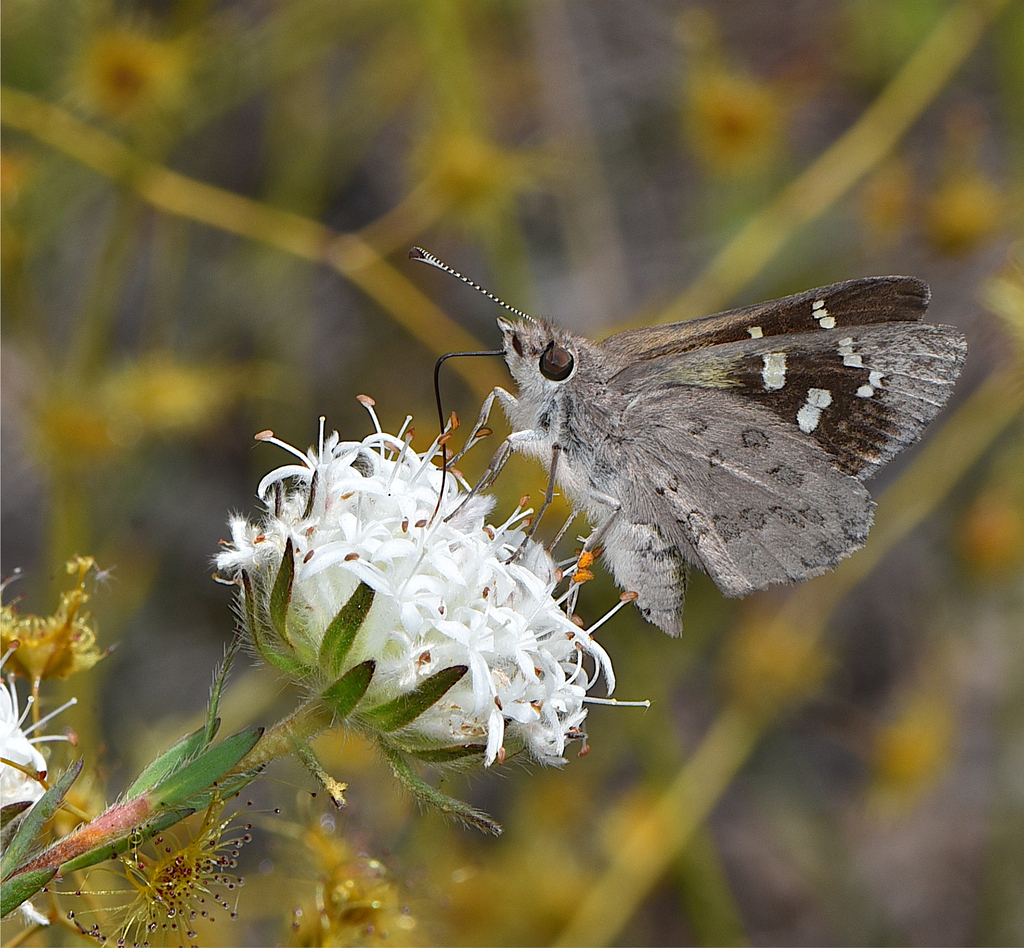

Scientific classification
- Kingdom: Animalia
- Phylum: Arthropoda
- Class: Insecta
- Order: Lepidoptera
- Family: Hesperiidae
- Genus: Antipodia
- Species: A. dactyliota

Binomial name
- Antipodia dactyliota Meyrick, 1888

Synonyms
- Telesto dactyliota; Motasingha nila; Motasingha anaces; Motasingha anapus

= Antipodia dactyliota =

Species of butterfly

Antipodia dactyliota is a species of butterfly of the family Hesperiidae. It is found in Western Australia.

The wingspan is about 30 mm.

The larvae feed on Gahnia lanigera.

== Subspecies ==
- Antipodia dactyliota anaces
- Antipodia dactyliota anapus
- Antipodia dactyliota nila
