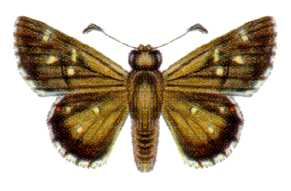
- Neohesperilla senta

Scientific classification
- Kingdom: Animalia
- Phylum: Arthropoda
- Clade: Pancrustacea
- Class: Insecta
- Order: Lepidoptera
- Family: Hesperiidae
- Subfamily: Trapezitinae
- Genus: Neohesperilla; Waterhouse & Lyell, 1914

= Neohesperilla =

Genus of butterflies

Neohesperilla is a genus of skipper butterflies in the family Hesperiidae.

== Species ==
- Neohesperilla croceus Miskin, 1889
- Neohesperilla senta Miskin, 1891
- Neohesperilla xanthomera Meyrick & Lower, 1902
- Neohesperilla xiphiphora Lower, 1911
