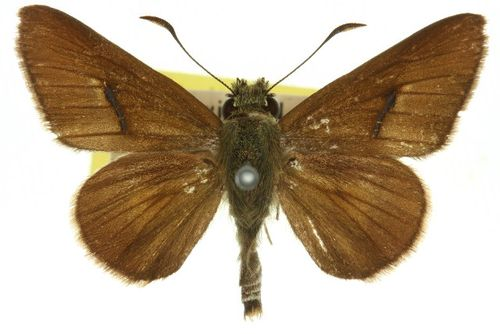

Scientific classification
- Kingdom: Animalia
- Phylum: Arthropoda
- Class: Insecta
- Order: Lepidoptera
- Family: Hesperiidae
- Genus: Hesperilla
- Species: H. sarnia

Binomial name
- Hesperilla sarnia Atkins, 1978

= Hesperilla sarnia =

Swift sedge skipper

Species of butterfly

Hesperilla sarnia, commonly known as the swift sedge skipper, is a species of butterfly in the family Hesperiidae. It is endemic to Queensland, Australia.
