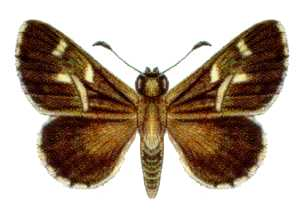

Scientific classification
- Kingdom: Animalia
- Phylum: Arthropoda
- Class: Insecta
- Order: Lepidoptera
- Family: Hesperiidae
- Genus: Toxidia
- Species: T. parvula

Binomial name
- Toxidia parvula (Plötz, 1884)

Synonyms
- Toxidia parvulus (Plötz, 1884); Telesto parvulus Plötz, 1884; Hesperilla humilis Miskin, 1889; Hesperilla ismene Anderson, E. & Spry, 1894

= Toxidia parvula =

Species of butterfly

Toxidia parvula, the parvula skipper or banded grass-skipper, is a butterfly of the family Hesperiidae. It is found in the Australian Capital Territory, New South Wales, Queensland and Victoria.
