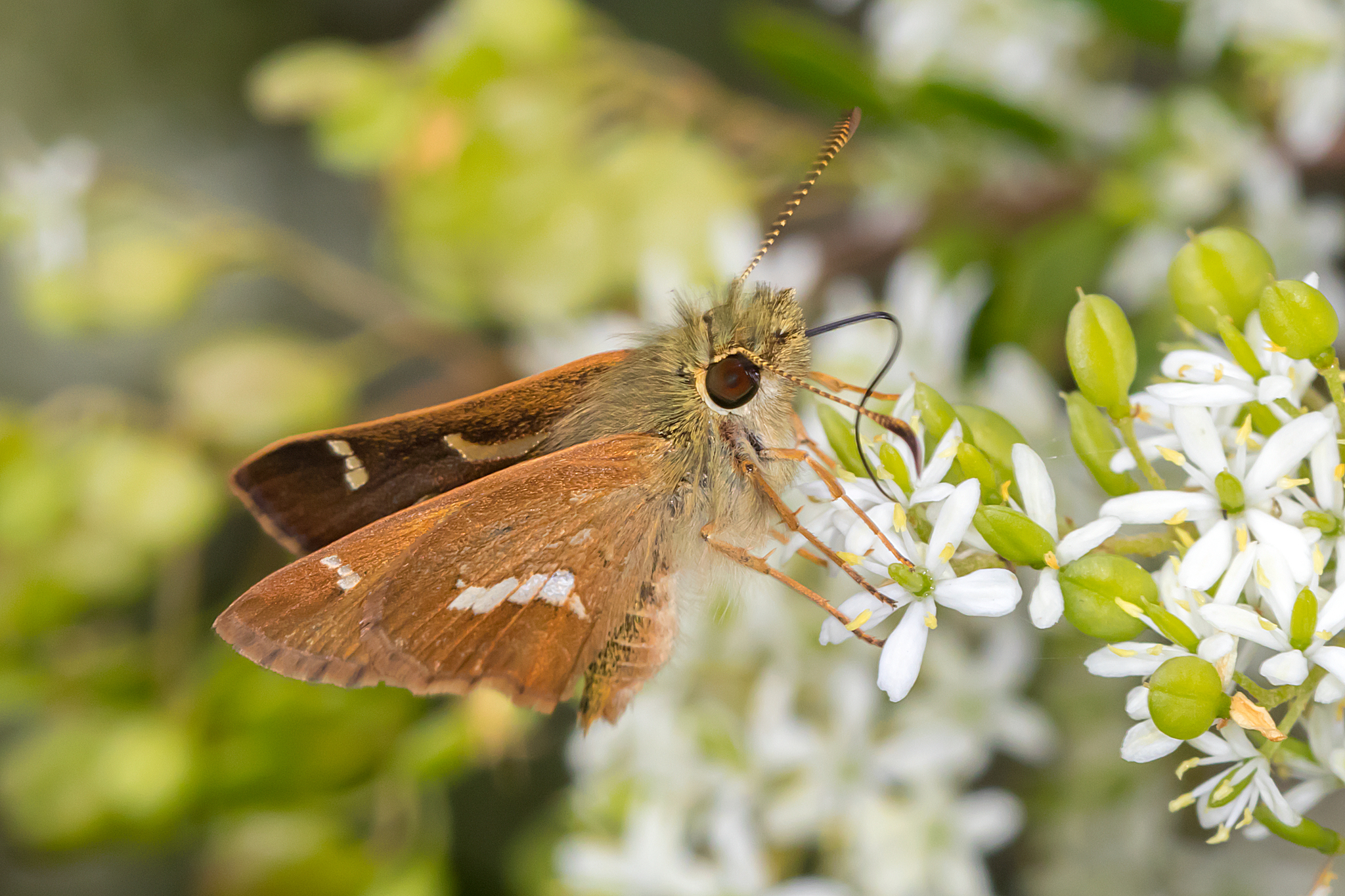
- Adult male D. compacta photographed in Warburton, Victoria
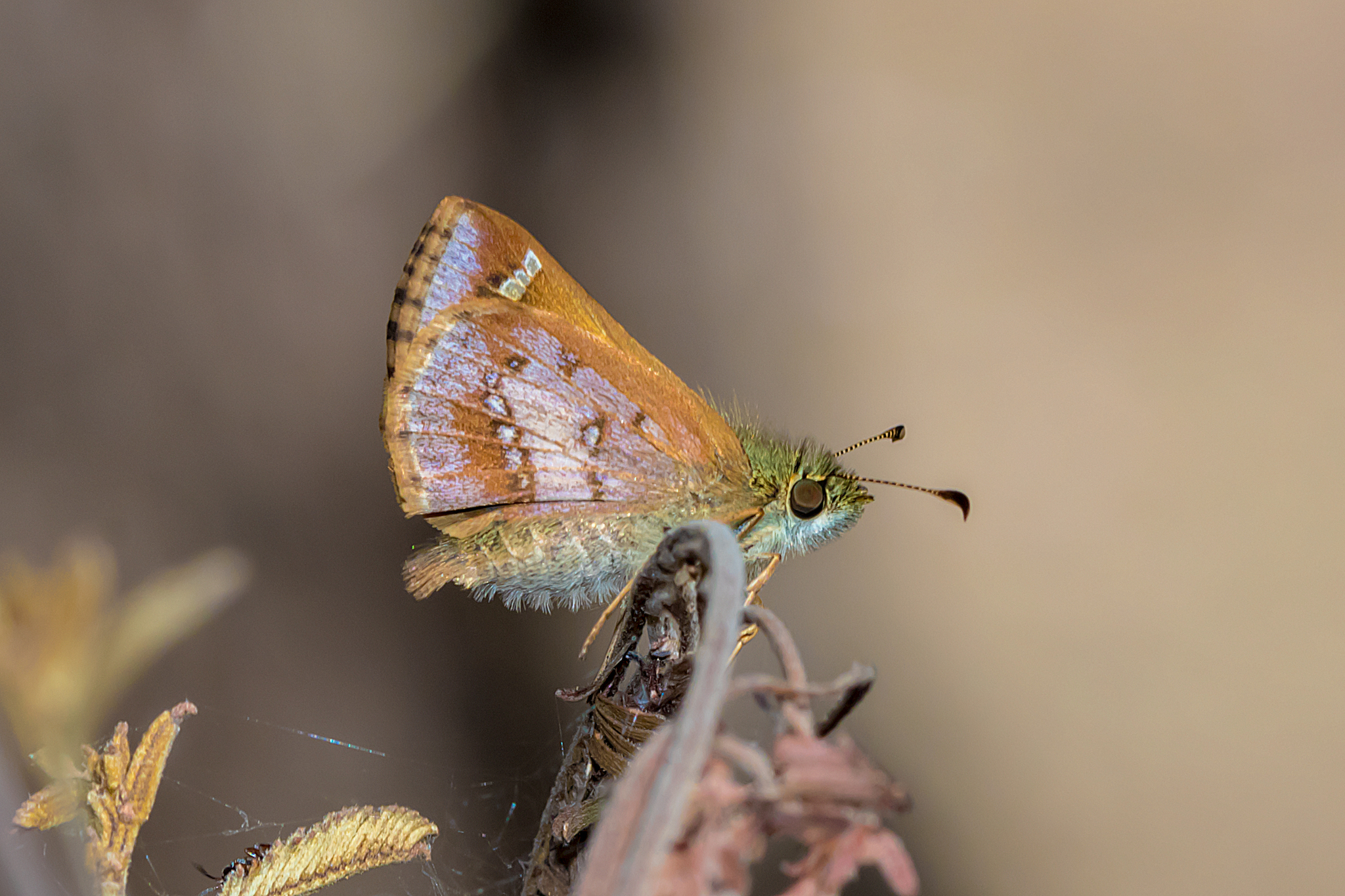
- Adult female D. compacta photographed in Warrandyte, Victoria

Scientific classification
- Kingdom: Animalia
- Phylum: Arthropoda
- Class: Insecta
- Order: Lepidoptera
- Family: Hesperiidae
- Genus: Dispar
- Species: D. compacta

Binomial name
- Dispar compacta (Butler, 1882)

Synonyms
- Telesto compacta Butler, 1882; Telesto scepticalis Rosenstock, 1885; Hesperilla melissa Mabille, 1891; Hesperilla atrax Mabille, 1891

= Dispar compacta =

Species of butterfly

Dispar compacta, commonly known as the dispar skipper, barred skipper, or barred grass-skipper, is a species of butterfly in the family Hesperiidae. It was described by Arthur Gardiner Butler in 1882 as Telesto compacta and is endemic to eastern Australia.

== Distribution and habitat ==
Dispar compacta occurs in the Australian Capital Territory, New South Wales, Queensland, South Australia, and Victoria. It can be found in moist grasslands, open forests, and urban parks and gardens in shaded areas where grasses grow.

== Description ==
Dispar compacta adults are brown above and orange-brown below with white or cream-coloured markings on the wings and a wingspan of approximately 23 mm (0.91 in). Males and females exhibit different markings on the wings. From above, the forewings of males each have a cream-coloured hook-shaped marking, a central spot, a band of three subapical spots, and a central band of grey sex scales, while the hindwings each have a band of four cream-coloured postmedian spots. From above, the forewings of females each have two central spots, a band of three subapical spots, a spot near the middle of the leading edge of the forewing, and a spot near the trailing edge of the forewing – lacking the hook-shaped marking and grey sex scales present on the forewings of males – while the hindwings each have a central yellow patch. From below, the forewings and hindwings of males exhibit markings similar to those above. From below, the forewings of females exhibit markings similar to those above and the hindwings exhibit a band of whitish-grey spots edged with brown, but both fore and hindwings are suffused with purplish-grey.

Eggs are dome-shaped, white to cream in colour, measuring approximately 0.7 mm (0.028 in) by 0.6 mm (0.024 in), with 12–14 longitudinal ribs. As the egg develops, a purplish-red dorsal spot and lateral band appears.

First instar larvae are yellowish, becoming green as they feed, with a large, shiny black head and dark red prothoracic plate. Second instar larvae are similar, but develop a broad white longitudinal dorsal band with a narrow green dorsal line at the centre. Third instar larvae resemble second instar larvae, but the surface of the head is now rough and both the head and prothoracic plate have turned brown. By the fifth and final instar the larva is 18–20 mm (0.71–0.79 in) long, greenish-pink in colour, with a diffuse, pale longitudinal dorsal band, a darker central line within the dorsal band, and a narrow white longitudinal subdorsal line.

Pupae are cylindrical, brown in colour, measuring 12–15 mm (0.47–0.59 in) long, and covered with a white powder.

== Behaviour and ecology ==
The larvae feed primarily on grasses such as Ehrharta erecta, Microlaena stipoides, Poa labillardieri, Poa queenslandica, Poa sieberiana, and Poa tenera. Other host plants include species of Gahnia and Lomandra. Some larvae will feed on the new growth of invasive kikuyu grass (Cenchrus clandestinus), however, this is toxic to the larvae.

Dispar compacta is univoltine, with one generation each year. Eggs are usually laid singly, rarely in pairs or short rows, on the leaves of the host plant or on leaf litter. Development begins immediately, however, the larva will not emerge until autumn. Upon hatching, the larva consumes the shell of its egg before moving on. When a suitable host plant is found, the larva will construct a shelter by folding or rolling the host leaf and binding it in place with silk. The larvae are nocturnal, hiding in this shelter during the day and emerging to feed at night. Growth is slow through winter, but accelerates in spring, with the larvae beginning to pupate in late December and emerging in January and February.

Adults are active between January and April and may be locally abundant in some areas. They fly low to the ground, usually in grassy areas, actively feeding on flowers. Males engage in hilltopping and can be seen patrolling their territory or perched high in the canopy.
