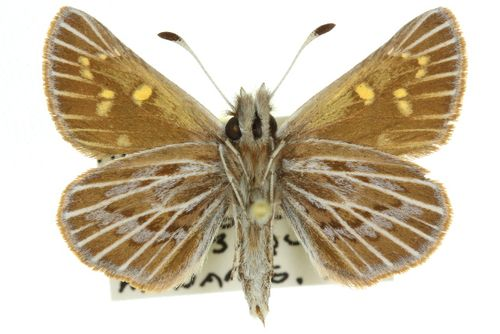

Scientific classification
- Kingdom: Animalia
- Phylum: Arthropoda
- Class: Insecta
- Order: Lepidoptera
- Family: Hesperiidae
- Genus: Herimosa
- Species: H. albovenata

Binomial name
- Herimosa albovenata Waterhouse, 1940

Synonyms
- Anisynta albovenata; Anisynta weemala; Anisynta fuscata

= Herimosa albovenata =

Species of butterfly

Herimosa albovenata, the white-veined skipper, is a butterfly of the family Hesperiidae. It is found in Australia in inland New South Wales, South Australia and Western Australia.

The wingspan is about 30 mm (1.2 in).

The larvae feed on Austrostipa scabra, Austrostipa semibarbata, Austrostipa falcata and Austrostipa eremophila.

== Subspecies ==
- Herimosa albovenata albovenata
- Herimosa albovenata fuscata
- Herimosa albovenata weemala
