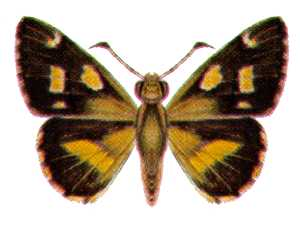

Scientific classification
- Kingdom: Animalia
- Phylum: Arthropoda
- Class: Insecta
- Order: Lepidoptera
- Family: Hesperiidae
- Genus: Hesperilla
- Species: H. picta

Binomial name
- Hesperilla picta (Leach, 1814)

Synonyms
- Hesperia picta Leach, 1814

= Hewitsoniella =

Species of butterfly

Hesperilla picta, also known as the painted sedge-skipper or painted skipper, is a species of butterfly in the family Hesperiidae. It is found in the Australian states of New South Wales, Queensland and Victoria.

The wingspan is about 30 mm.

The larvae feed on Gahnia clarkei.
