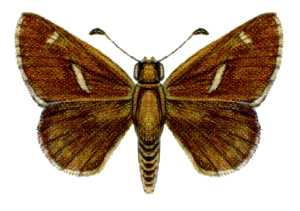

Scientific classification
- Kingdom: Animalia
- Phylum: Arthropoda
- Class: Insecta
- Order: Lepidoptera
- Family: Hesperiidae
- Genus: Toxidia
- Species: T. thyrrhus

Binomial name
- Toxidia thyrrhus Mabille, 1891

Synonyms
- Telesto bathrophora Meyrick & Lower, 1902

= Toxidia thyrrhus =

Species of butterfly

Toxidia thyrrhus, the dusky grass-skipper or thyrrhus skipper, is a butterfly of the family Hesperiidae. It is endemic to Queensland, Australia.

The wingspan is about 25 mm.

The larvae feed on Cenchrus echinatus.
