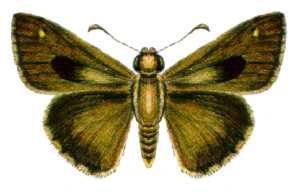

Scientific classification
- Kingdom: Animalia
- Phylum: Arthropoda
- Class: Insecta
- Order: Lepidoptera
- Family: Hesperiidae
- Genus: Timoconia
- Species: T. tymbophora

Binomial name
- Timoconia tymbophora (Meyrick & Lower, 1902)

Synonyms
- Signeta tymbophora (Meyrick & Lower, 1902); Telesto tymbophora Meyrick & Lower, 1902

= Timoconia tymbophora =

Species of butterfly

Timoconia tymbophora, the dark shield-skipper or dingy shield skipper, is a butterfly of the family Hesperiidae. It is found in the Australian states of New South Wales and Queensland.

The wingspan is about 30 mm.
