= Herimosa =

Scientific classification
- Kingdom: Animalia
- Phylum: Arthropoda
- Class: Insecta
- Order: Lepidoptera
- Family: Hesperiidae
- Genus: Herimosa; Atkins, 1994

Genus of butterflies

Herimosa is a genus of skipper butterflies in the family Hesperiidae.

== Species ==
- Herimosa albovenata Waterhouse, 1940
