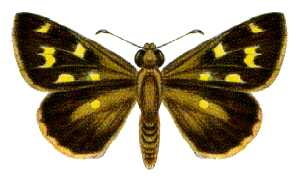

Scientific classification
- Kingdom: Animalia
- Phylum: Arthropoda
- Class: Insecta
- Order: Lepidoptera
- Family: Hesperiidae
- Genus: Hesperilla
- Species: H. dirphia

Binomial name
- Hesperilla dirphia Hewitson, 1868

Synonyms
- Motasingha dirphia

= Hesperilla dirphia =

Species of butterfly

Hesperilla dirphia, the dirphia skipper, is a butterfly of the family Hesperiidae. It is found in the state of Western Australia.

The wingspan is about 40 mm. The Caterpillars are a translucent green with white spots, and have a pinkish thorax and tail, and a black head. The adults are dark brown, with cream spots on each fore wing. The males also have a broken black patch on the upper surface of each forewing. The undersides are reddish brown with cream spots, which are black-edged under each hind wing.
