= Cyperus microcephalus =

Scientific classification
- Kingdom: Plantae
- Clade: Embryophytes
- Clade: Tracheophytes
- Clade: Spermatophytes
- Clade: Angiosperms
- Clade: Monocots
- Clade: Commelinids
- Order: Poales
- Family: Cyperaceae
- Genus: Cyperus
- Species: C. microcephalus

Binomial name
- Cyperus microcephalus R.Br.

Species of plant

Cyperus microcephalus is a sedge of the family Cyperaceae that is native to northern Australia.

The erect perennial sedge typically grows to a height of 0.2 to 1.2 metres (0.7 to 3.9 ft) and has a tufted habit. It blooms between January and July and produces green-yellow-brown flowers.

It is found in seasonally dry tropical areas in Queensland, the Northern Territory and Western Australia. In Western Australia it is found on rocky hillsides, cliffs, among boulders, in rock crevices and in creek beds in the Kimberley region where it grows in sandy soils over sandstone.

== See also ==
- List of Cyperus species
