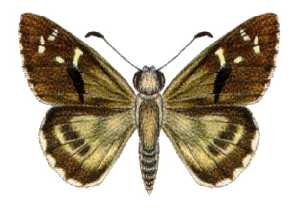

Scientific classification
- Domain: Eukaryota
- Kingdom: Animalia
- Phylum: Arthropoda
- Class: Insecta
- Order: Lepidoptera
- Family: Hesperiidae
- Genus: Hesperilla
- Species: H. trimaculata

Binomial name
- Hesperilla trimaculata Tepper, 1882

Synonyms
- Motasingha trimaculata; Hesperilla quadrimaculata; Motasingha dilata; Motasingha dea; Motasingha occidentalis

= Hesperilla trimaculata =

Species of butterfly

Hesperilla trimaculata, the three spot skipper, is a butterfly of the family Hesperiidae. It is found in Australia.

The wingspan is about 35 mm.

The larvae feed on Lepidosperma angustatum, Lepidosperma carphoides, Lepidosperma concavum, Lepidosperma viscidum and Phlebocarya ciliata.

== Subspecies ==
The following are subspecies of Hesperilla trimaculata:

- Hesperilla trimaculata trimaculata (Victoria and South Australia)
- Hesperilla trimaculata dea (New South Wales)
- Hesperilla trimaculata dilata (New South Wales)
- Hesperilla trimaculata occidentalis (Western Australia)
