= Cyperus decompositus =

Scientific classification
- Kingdom: Plantae
- Clade: Tracheophytes
- Clade: Angiosperms
- Clade: Monocots
- Clade: Commelinids
- Order: Poales
- Family: Cyperaceae
- Genus: Cyperus
- Species: C. decompositus

Binomial name
- Cyperus decompositus (R.Br.) F.Muell.

Species of plant endemic to Australia

Cyperus decompositus is a species of sedge that is endemic to north eastern Australia.

The species was first formally described by the botanist Robert Brown in 1810 as Mariscus decompositus, then reclassified by Ferdinand von Mueller in 1874 as a part of the work Fragmenta Phytographiae Australiae.

The range of the plant extends from the Northern Territory in the west to Queensland in the east from sea level to an altitude of 200 m (660 ft) usually as a part of rain forest, open forest or forest communities.

== See also ==
- List of Cyperus species
