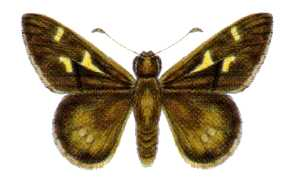

Scientific classification
- Kingdom: Animalia
- Phylum: Arthropoda
- Class: Insecta
- Order: Lepidoptera
- Family: Hesperiidae
- Genus: Neohesperilla
- Species: N. croceus

Binomial name
- Neohesperilla croceus Miskin, 1889

Synonyms
- Hesperilla croceus; Hesperilla satulla; Neohesperilla crocea

= Neohesperilla croceus =

Species of butterfly

Neohesperilla croceus, the crocea skipper, is a butterfly of the family Hesperiidae. It is found in New Guinea and in coastal paperbark swamps in Australia in the Northern Territory and Queensland.

The wingspan is about 30 mm.

The larvae feed on various grasses, including Chrysopogon aciculatus and Schizachyrium pachyarthron.
