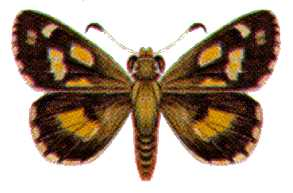

Scientific classification
- Kingdom: Animalia
- Phylum: Arthropoda
- Class: Insecta
- Order: Lepidoptera
- Family: Hesperiidae
- Genus: Hesperilla
- Species: H. perornata

Binomial name
- Hesperilla perornata Kirby, 1893

Synonyms
- Oreisplanus perornata (Kirby, 1893)

= Hesperilla perornata =

Species of butterfly

Hesperilla perornata, the montane sedge-skipper or mountain spotted skipper, is a butterfly of the family Hesperiidae. It is found in the mountains of the Australian states of New South Wales and Victoria.

The wingspan is about 30 mm.

The larvae feed on Gahnia sieberiana.
