= Acacia ophiolithica =

Scientific classification
- Kingdom: Plantae
- Clade: Tracheophytes
- Clade: Angiosperms
- Clade: Eudicots
- Clade: Rosids
- Order: Fabales
- Family: Fabaceae
- Subfamily: Caesalpinioideae
- Clade: Mimosoid clade
- Genus: Acacia
- Species: A. ophiolithica

Binomial name
- Acacia ophiolithica R.S.Cowan & Maslin
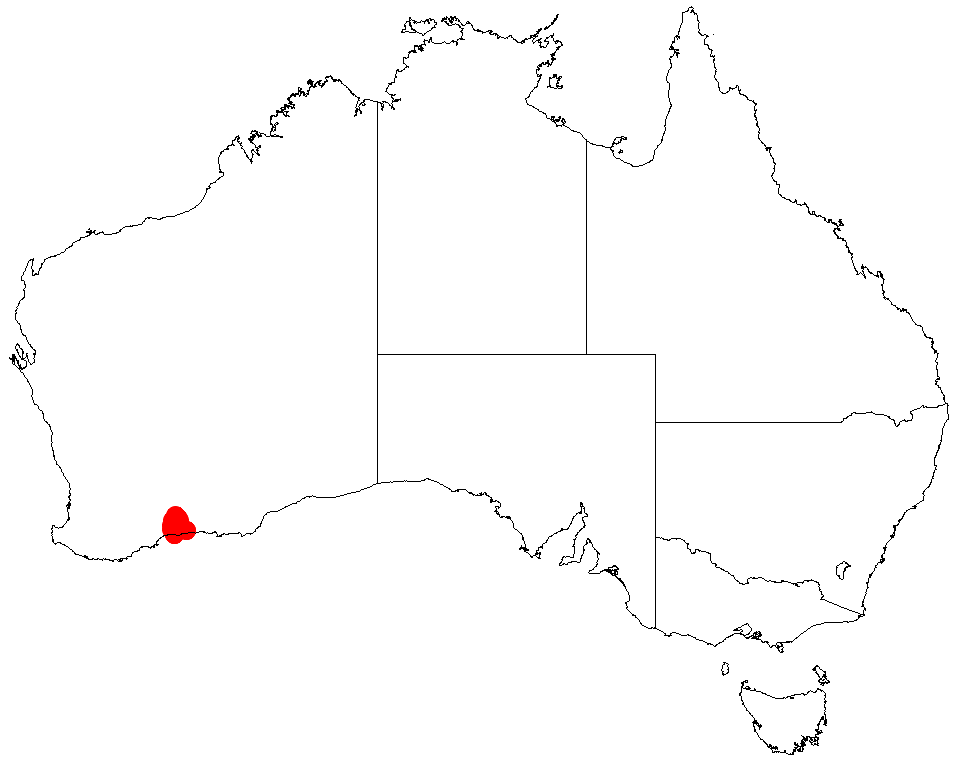
- Occurrence data from AVH

Synonyms
- Acacia aff. uncinella [P57] (B.R.Maslin 4053); Racosperma ophiolithicum (R.S.Cowan & Maslin) Pedley; Acacia uncinella auct. non Benth.: Bentham, G. (5 October 1864)

Species of legume

Acacia ophiolithica is a species of flowering plant in the family Fabaceae, and is endemic to the south of Western Australia. It is a bushy, rounded shrub with glabrous branchlets, crowded, ascending to erect, very slender terete phyllodes with a small point on the end, spherical heads of bright, light golden yellow flowers and linear, thinly leathery, glabrous pods.

== Description ==
Acacia ophiolithica is a bushy, rounded shrub that typically grows to a height of 0.3–2 m (1 ft 0 in – 6 ft 7 in) and has glabrous branchlets that are scarred with raised stem-projections where phyllodes have fallen. Its phyllodes are crowded, ascending to erect, very slender, straight and terete, 15–45 mm (0.59–1.77 in) long, 0.7–1 mm (0.028–0.039 in) in diameter and more or less abruptly narrowed to a short, point. There are four to eight very indistinc veins, the pulvinus slender, 1.5–2 mm (0.059–0.079 in) long and orange. The flowers are borne in two spherical heads in axils on thread-like peduncles 5–13 mm (0.20–0.51 in) long, each head 3.0–3.5 mm (0.12–0.14 in) in diameter with 10 to 15 bright, light golden yellow flowers. Flowering mostly occurs in September and October, and the pods are linear, straight or slightly curved, 30–40 mm (1.2–1.6 in) long, 2–3 mm (0.079–0.118 in) wide, slightly raised over the seeds on alternate sides, and thinly leathery, reddish brown and glabrous with thicked yellow margins. The seeds are oblong to egg-shaped, about 2 mm (0.079 in) long, slightly shiny dark brown with an aril near the end.

== Taxonomy ==
Acacia ophiolithica was first formally described in 1995 by Richard Sumner Cowan and Bruce Maslin in the journal Nuytsia from specimens collected by Maslin near the Jerdacuttup River, 10.5 km (6.5 mi) east of the Ravensthorpe-Hopetoun Road in 1980. The specific epithet (ophiolithica) refers to its habitat from the Latin 'opiothilithicus' suggesting 'soils deriving from serpentinite'.

== Distribution and habitat ==
This species of wattle grows in yellow-brown clay or clay-loam soils derived from serpentinite, sometimes rocky, on river banks and beneath mallee eucalypts, often forming dense stands, but it is restricted to, and locally commonly near the Jerdacuttup area east of Ravensthorpe in Esperance Plains and Mallee bioregions in the south of Western Australia.

== See also ==
- List of Acacia species
