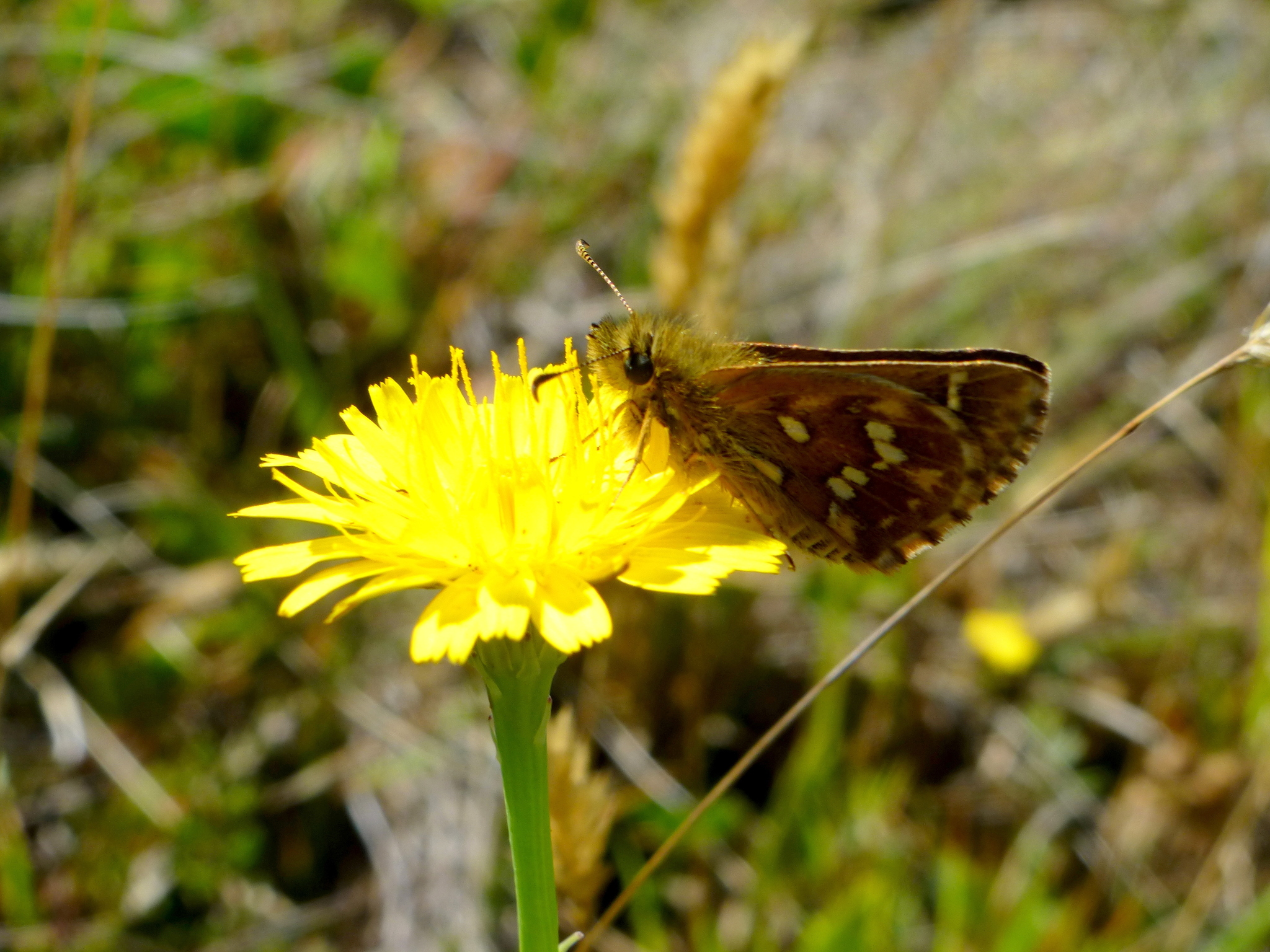
- Atkinsia dominula, Australia

Scientific classification
- Kingdom: Animalia
- Phylum: Arthropoda
- Class: Insecta
- Order: Lepidoptera
- Family: Hesperiidae
- Subfamily: Trapezitinae
- Genus: Atkinsia; Braby & Toussaint, 2022
- Species: A. dominula

Binomial name
- Atkinsia dominula (Plötz, 1884)

= Atkinsia dominula =

Genus of butterflies

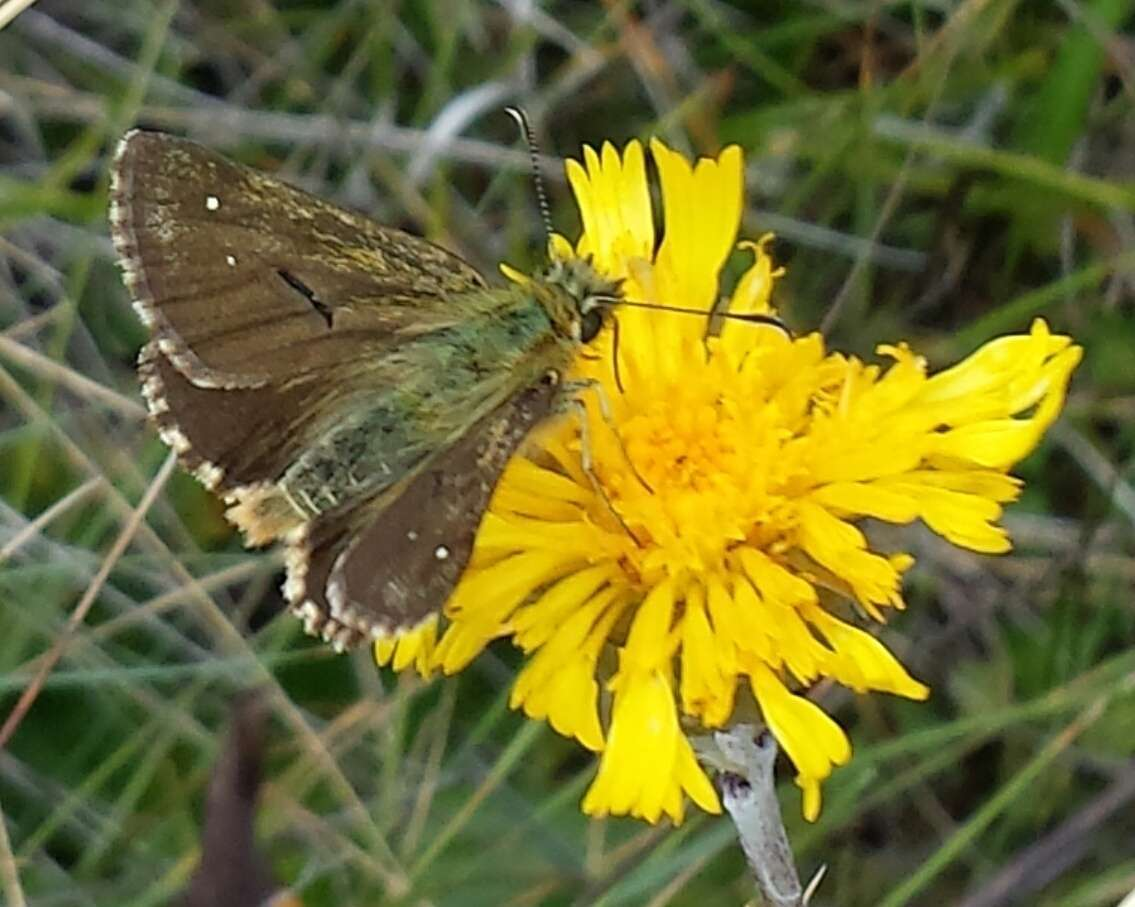
Atkinsia dominula, Australia

Atkinsia is a genus of Australian skippers in the butterfly family Hesperiidae. This genus has a single species, Atkinsia dominula (Plötz, 1884).

== Subspecies ==
These two subspecies belong to the species Atkinsia dominula:

- Atkinsia dominula dominula (Plötz, 1884)
- Atkinsia dominula pria (Waterhouse, 1932)
