= Gahnia lanigera =

Scientific classification
- Kingdom: Plantae
- Clade: Tracheophytes
- Clade: Angiosperms
- Clade: Monocots
- Clade: Commelinids
- Order: Poales
- Family: Cyperaceae
- Genus: Gahnia
- Species: G. lanigera

Binomial name
- Gahnia lanigera (R.Br.) Benth., 1878

Synonyms
- Cladium lanigerum R. Br., 1810

Species of sedge

Gahnia lanigera, also known as the black grass saw-sedge, desert saw-sedge or little saw-sedge, is a species of flowering plant in the sedge family that is found in southern Australia. The specific epithet lanigera means 'woolly'.

== Description ==
The plant is a rhizomatous, tufted perennial sedge growing up to 45 cm high and 2 m wide, with stiff, narrow, sharp-pointed leaves. The flowers are brown. It is a favoured food plant of Antipodia atralba, the black and white skipper butterfly.

== Distribution and habitat ==
The species occurs in arid parts of southern Western Australia, South Australia, north-western Victoria and western New South Wales where it is found on sandy soils in mallee woodland and heathland, as well as on clayey or granitic loams and coastal dunes.
