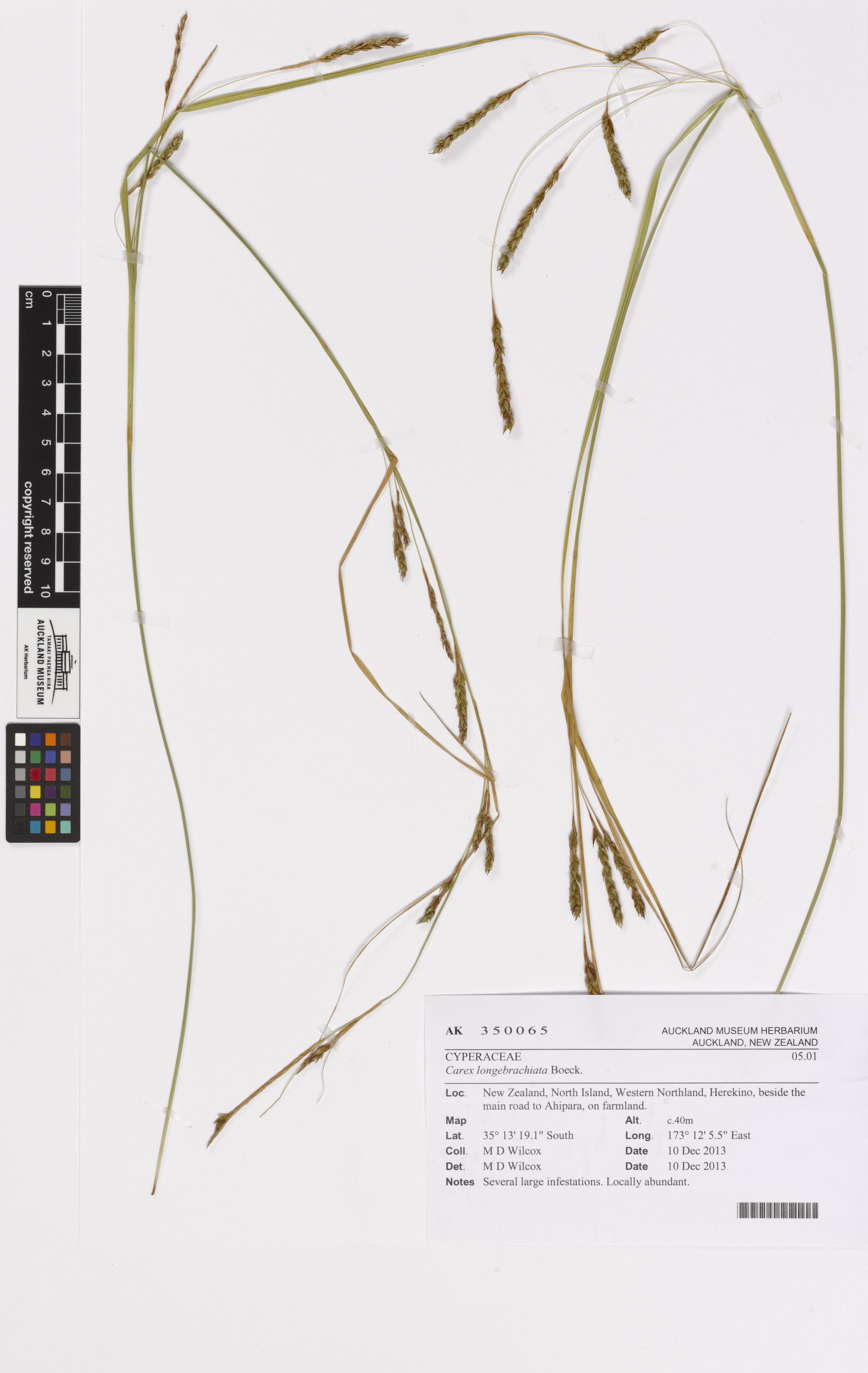

Scientific classification
- Kingdom: Plantae
- Clade: Tracheophytes
- Clade: Angiosperms
- Clade: Monocots
- Clade: Commelinids
- Order: Poales
- Family: Cyperaceae
- Genus: Carex
- Species: C. longebrachiata

Binomial name
- Carex longebrachiata Boeckeler

= Carex longebrachiata =

Species of grass-like plant

Carex longebrachiata, commonly known as Australian sedge or drooping sedge, is a plant species in the sedge family, Cyperaceae. It is native to Australia.

== Description ==
It is 30–90 centimetres (12–35 in) high with the leaves being strongly keeled, Y-shaped and are 3–5 millimetres (0.12–0.20 in) wide. The species culms are erect, smooth on the bottom and scabrous above. They are 40–80 centimetres (16–31 in) in length and are circa 1.3 millimetres (0.051 in) in diameter. It has drooped inflorescence which are 40–90 centimetres (16–35 in) in length and are usually longer than the culm. The species have 1-8 spikes which are long-pedicellate and droop by maturity. They are 2.5–5.5 centimetres (0.98–2.17 in) long and are distant from each other. The upper spike is gynaecandrous but under rare circumstances can be androgynaecandrous. Glumes are yellowish-brown to red-brown are acute, obtuse and mucronate. Female glumes are 3.5–5.5 millimetres (0.14–0.22 in) while narrowly obovoid utricles are 4.5–7 millimetres (0.18–0.28 in) long and 1.5–1.8 millimetres (0.059–0.071 in) wide. They are hispid above, pale brown coloured while their beak is 1.5–2.5 millimetres (0.059–0.098 in) in length. Its apex is split with the anthers being circa 3 millimetres (0.12 in) in length (excluding 0.2 millimetres (0.0079 in) appendages).
