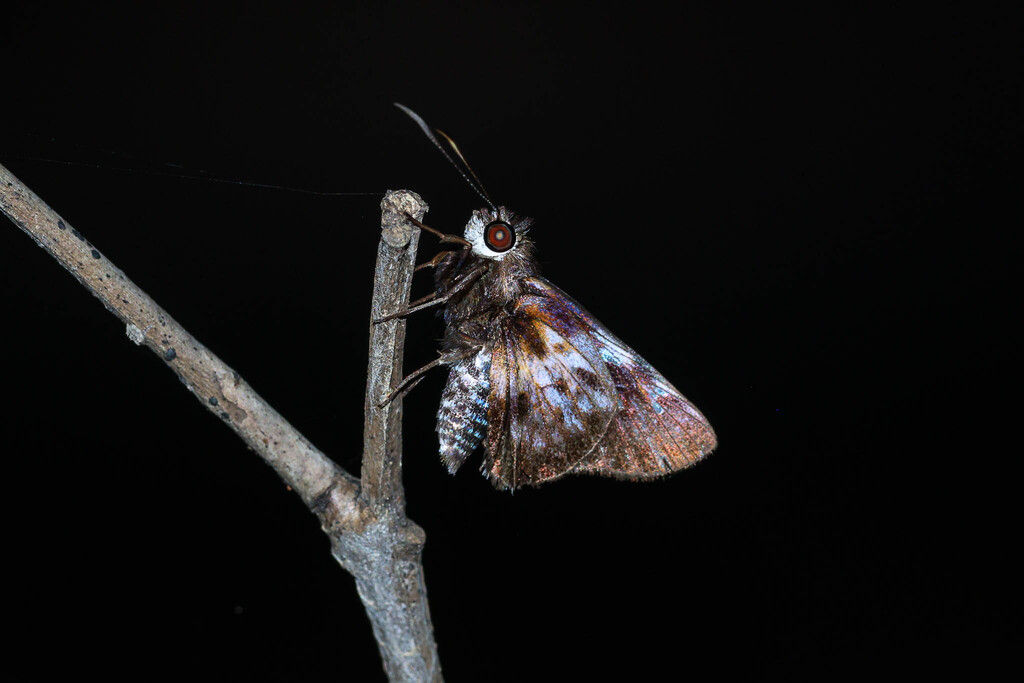

Scientific classification
- Kingdom: Animalia
- Phylum: Arthropoda
- Class: Insecta
- Order: Lepidoptera
- Family: Hesperiidae
- Genus: Rachelia; Hemming, 1964
- Species: R. extrusa

Binomial name
- Rachelia extrusa C. & R. Felder, 1867

Synonyms
- Rachelia extrusus Felder, 1867

= Rachelia (butterfly) =

Genus of butterflies

Rachelia is a genus of skipper butterflies in the family Hesperiidae. The sole species of this genus is Rachelia extrusa. It is found along the coast of New Guinea and Cape York in the far north of Australia.

The wingspan is about 30 mm.

The larvae feed on Flagellaria indica.
