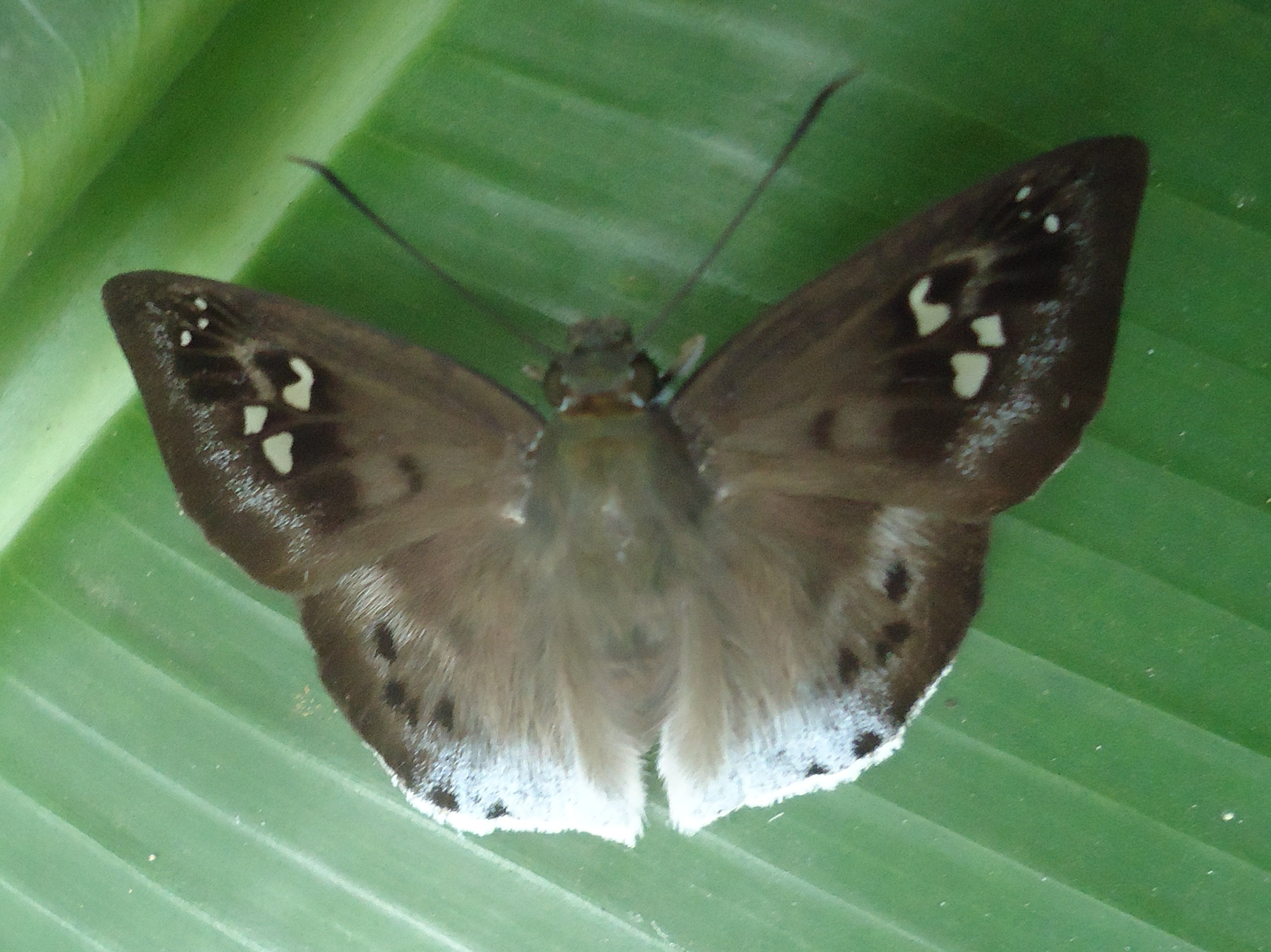
- Tagiades parra parra from Mindanao, Philippines

Scientific classification
- Kingdom: Animalia
- Phylum: Arthropoda
- Class: Insecta
- Order: Lepidoptera
- Family: Hesperiidae
- Genus: Tagiades
- Species: T. parra

Binomial name
- Tagiades parra Fruhstorfer, 1910

Synonyms
- Tagiades gana parra Fruhstorfer, 1910; Tagiades naxos Evans, 1949

= Tagiades parra =

Species of butterfly

Tagiades parra is a species of spread-winged skipper butterflies in the genus Tagiades. It is found from Sikkim and Assam to Indochina and all throughout maritime Southeast Asia. The species was first described by the German entomologist Hans Fruhstorfer in 1910 as a subspecies of Tagiades gana. The type specimens were collected from Kota Kinabalu, Malaysia. The species name is from Latin parra, a supernatural bird (usually an owl or a crow) bringing ill omen.

It has since been recognized as a separate species and four subspecies are included under it:

- Tagiades parra gala Evans, 1949
- Tagiades parra naxos Evans, 1949
- Tagiades parra niasana Mabille & Boullet, 1916
- Tagiades parra parra Fruhstorfer, 1910

Tagiades parra can be distinguished from other species of Tagiades by the absence of hyaline spots in space 11 over the cell spot, and spaces 2 and 3 in the forewings. A dark spot on space 6 on the upper side of the hindwing is closer to the edges (termen) than to the origin of vein 7. The hind tibiae of males also lack hair pencils.
