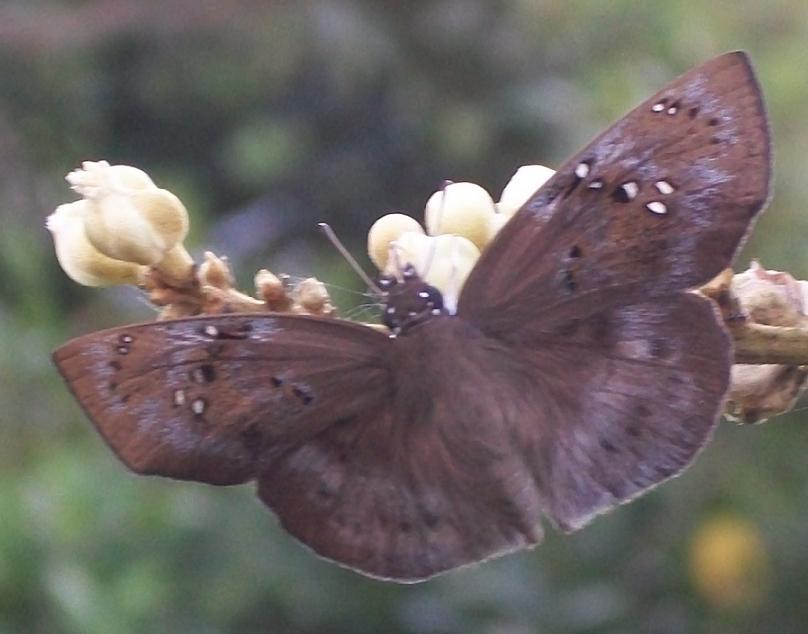
- A male of the summer form

Scientific classification
- Kingdom: Animalia
- Phylum: Arthropoda
- Clade: Pancrustacea
- Class: Insecta
- Order: Lepidoptera
- Family: Hesperiidae
- Genus: Tagiades
- Species: T. flesus

Binomial name
- Tagiades flesus (Fabricius, 1781)

Synonyms
- Papilio flesus Fabricius, 1781; Papilio ophion Drury, 1782; Tagiades flesus f. ophelia Evans, 1937

= Tagiades flesus =

Clouded forester

Species of butterfly

Tagiades flesus, the clouded flat, clouded forester or clouded skipper, is a butterfly of the family Hesperiidae found across much of the Afrotropical realm.

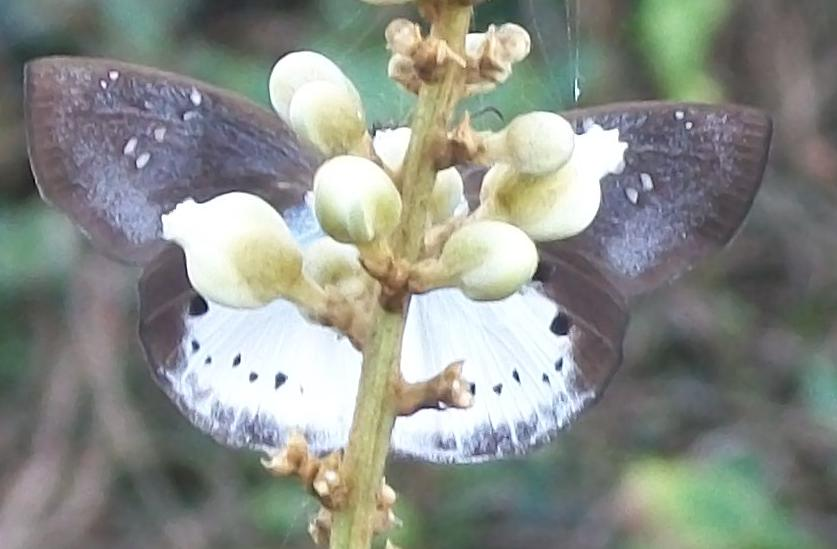
The underside of Tagiades flesus

== Description ==
The wingspan is 35–47 mm (1.4–1.9 in) for males and 43–49 mm (1.7–1.9 in) for females. The upper surface of the wings is brownish with translucent spots near the apex of the forewings. These spots are larger in the female than in the male. The undersurface of the hindwings is white with a semicircle of irregular black spots. The winter form is lighter in colour than the summer form.

== Distribution ==
This species is found in forest areas from the Eastern Cape of South Africa, through Eswatini and to the border of Zimbabwe. and in Western Africa.

Torben Larsen developed a species numbering system for his 2005 publication Butterflies of West Africa. This species is #1232. The 'Larsen' numbers have since been used with permission in A Sharp Eye on Butterflies of Ghana.

== Life cycle ==
=== Eggs ===
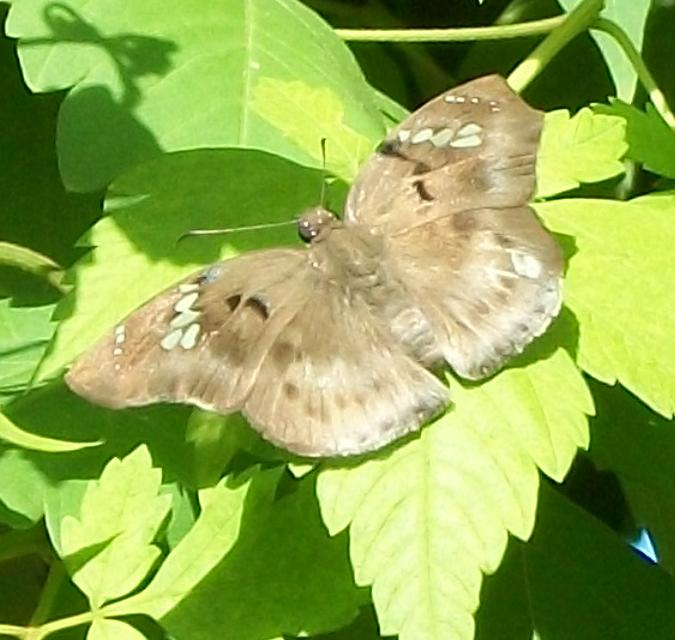
Female

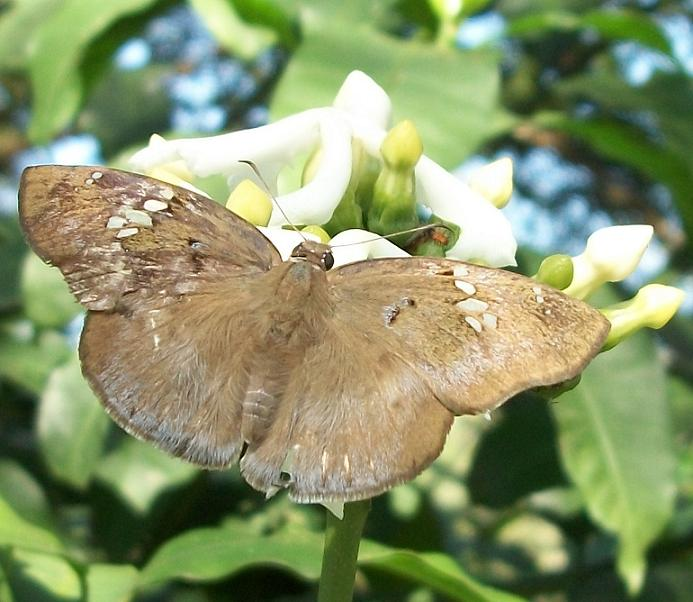
On flowers of Tabernaemontana ventricosa

Single eggs are laid on the shoots of the food plants.

=== Larvae ===
The larvae feed on Dioscorea species (including D. malifolia) and Grewia species. The larva makes a shelter by cutting part way through a leaf from its edge and folding it over, or by sticking two leaves together with silk.

=== Pupae ===
The pupa is formed within the leaf shelter and is light brown in colour.

=== Adults ===
Adults are on wing year-round; in warmer areas with peaks in late summer and autumn. The males select territories and fly rapidly, with the white underside of the wings "flashing". The females fly randomly throughout the forest. The adults feed from flowers, including those of Deinbollia oblongifolia and Tabernaemontana ventricosa. These butterflies usually sit with the wings open.
