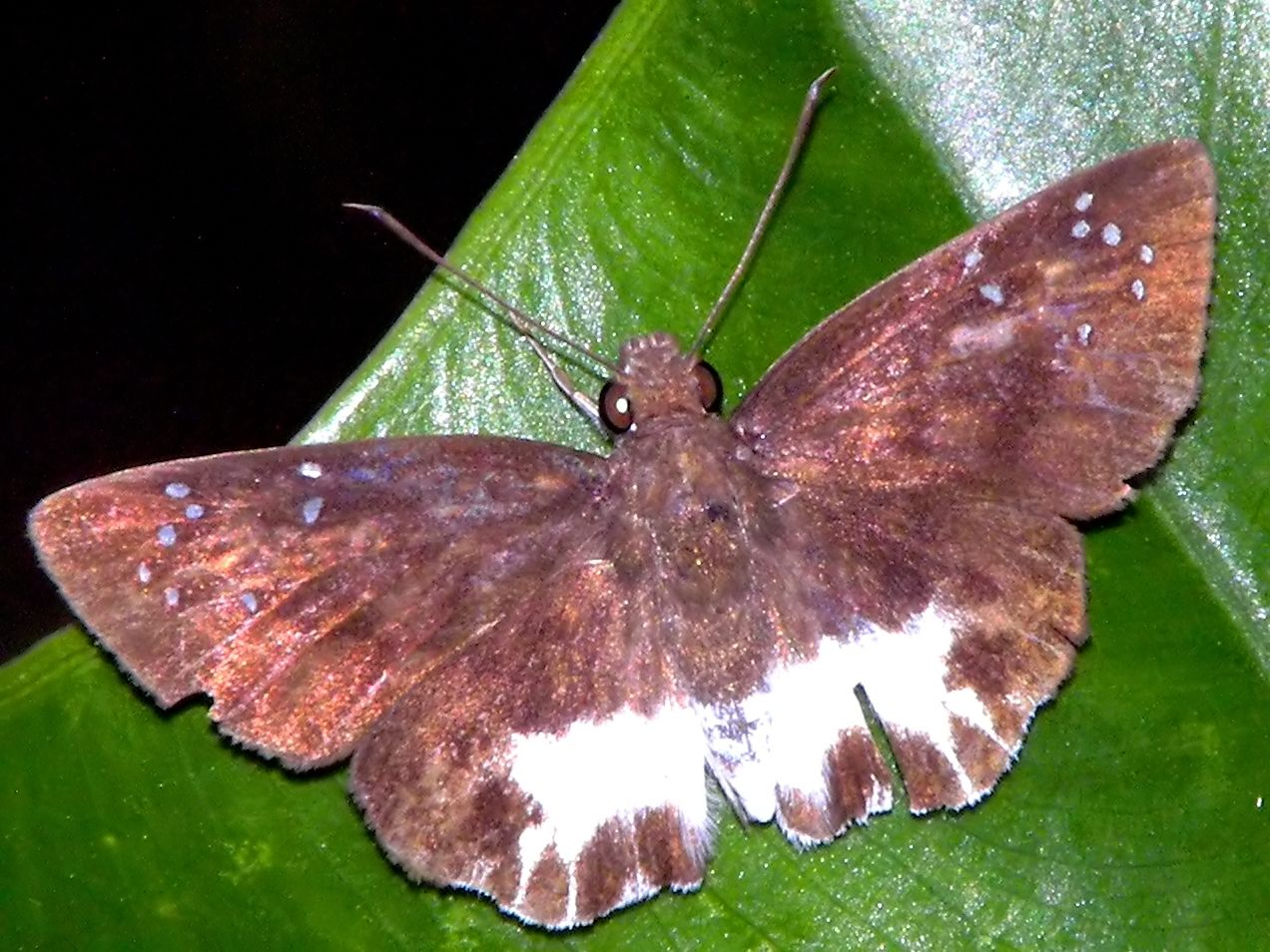
- In Hong Kong

Scientific classification
- Domain: Eukaryota
- Kingdom: Animalia
- Phylum: Arthropoda
- Class: Insecta
- Order: Lepidoptera
- Family: Hesperiidae
- Genus: Tagiades
- Species: T. menaka

Binomial name
- Tagiades menaka (Moore, 1867)

Synonyms
- Pterygospidea menaka Moore, 1867; Tagiades manis Evans, 1934; Tagiades vulturna Plötz, 1884; Tagiades menaka gavina Fruhstorfer, 1910

= Tagiades menaka =

Spotted snow flat

Species of butterfly

Tagiades menaka, commonly known as the spotted snow flat or the dark-edged snow flat, is a species of spread-winged skipper butterflies. It contains three subspecies.

- Tagiades menaka manis

Found in the Himalayas from Kashmir to Assam, and Burma

- Tagiades menaka mantra Evans, 1934

Found in the northwest Himalayas, Burma, Thailand, Laos, northern Vietnam, and Hainan, southern China

- Tagiades menaka menaka Evans, 1934

T. m. vajuna from Kanara, India has been transferred to the species Tagiades litigiosa. T. m. var. formosana and T. m. var. cohaerens of southern China and Taiwan, has been reclassified as Tagiades cohaerens.
