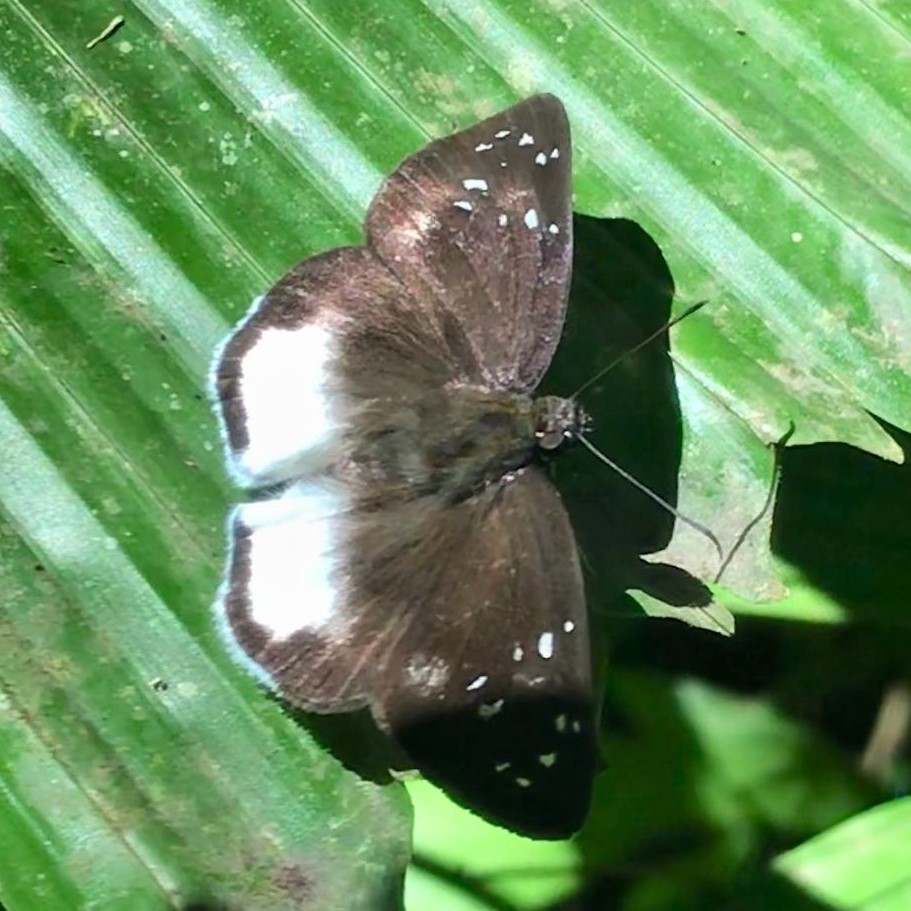

Scientific classification
- Kingdom: Animalia
- Phylum: Arthropoda
- Class: Insecta
- Order: Lepidoptera
- Family: Hesperiidae
- Genus: Tagiades
- Species: T. nestus

Binomial name
- Tagiades nestus (Felder, 1860)

Synonyms
- List: Pterygospidea nestus Felder, 1860; Tagiades curatus Fruhstorfer, 1910; Tagiades curiosa Swinhoe, 1905; Tagiades korela Mabille, 1891; Tagiades metanga Ribbe, 1889; Tagiades monachus Fruhstorfer, 1910; Tagiades sivoa Swinhoe, 1904; Tagiades swinhoei Fruhstorfer, 1910; Tagiades ternatensis Mabille & Boullet, 1916

= Tagiades nestus =

Species of butterfly

Tagiades nestus, the Papuan snow flat or Nestus flat, is a butterfly of the family Hesperiidae. It is found on the Australian islands in the Torres Strait and in New Guinea.

Its wingspan is about 40 mm (1.6 in).

Its larvae feed on Dioscorea species.

== Subspecies ==
This species is divided into the following subspecies:

- Tagiades nestus subsp. biakana Evans, 1934
- Tagiades nestus subsp. brunta Evans, 1949
- Tagiades nestus subsp. gilolensis Mabille, 1878
- Tagiades nestus subsp. juncta Evans, 1949
- Tagiades nestus subsp. mefora Evans, 1934
- Tagiades nestus subsp. nestus
- Tagiades nestus subsp. pentaja Fruhstorfer, 1910
- Tagiades nestus subsp. presbyter Butler, 1882
- Tagiades nestus subsp. suffusus Rothschild, 1915
