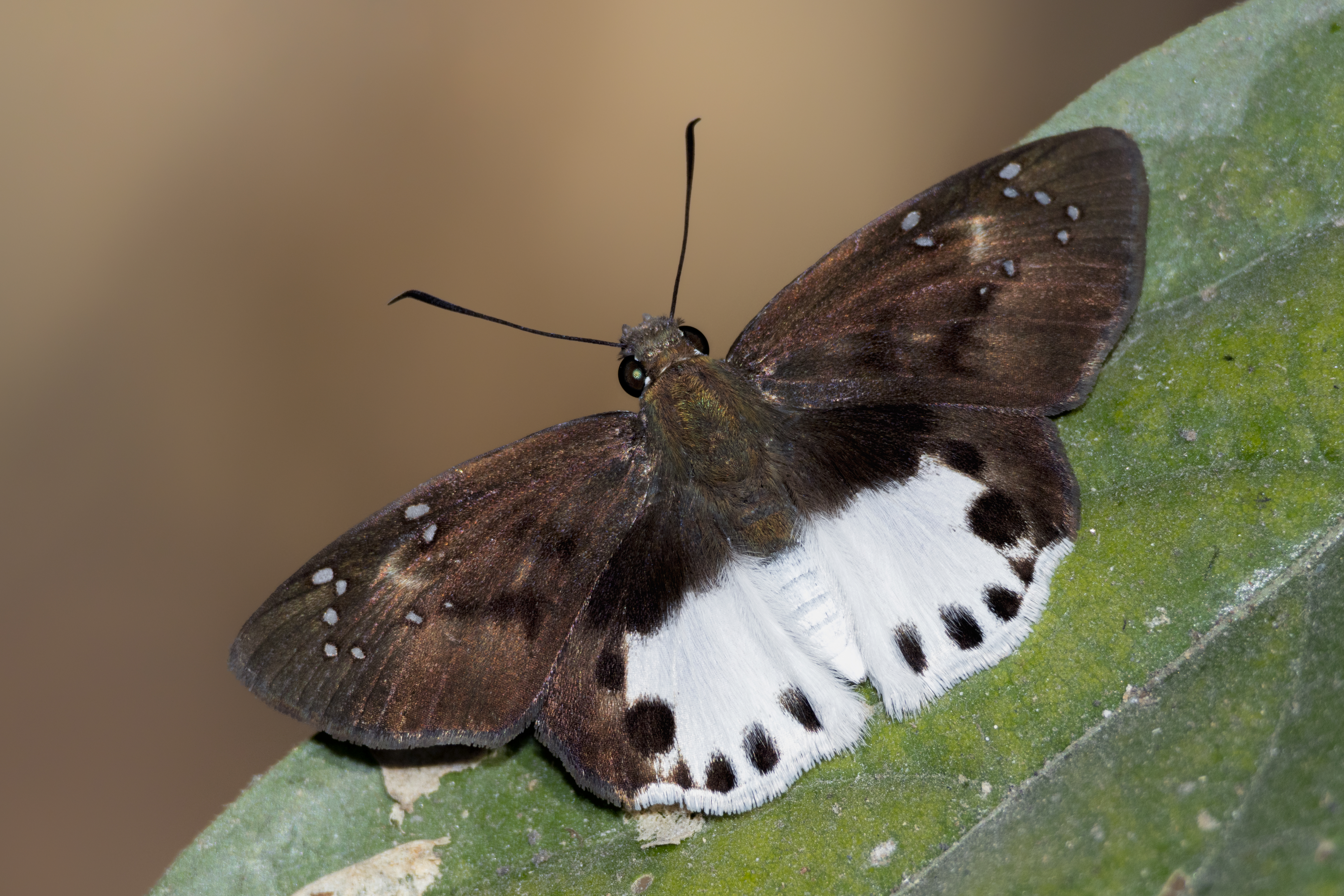

Scientific classification
- Kingdom: Animalia
- Phylum: Arthropoda
- Class: Insecta
- Order: Lepidoptera
- Family: Hesperiidae
- Genus: Tagiades
- Species: T. litigiosa

Binomial name
- Tagiades litigiosa (Möschler, 1878)

Synonyms
- Tagiades menaka vajuna Fruhstorfer, 1910

= Tagiades litigiosa =

Water snow flat

Species of butterfly

Tagiades litigiosa, the water snow flat, is a butterfly belonging to the family Hesperiidae which is found in India, Sri Lanka, and Myanmar.

== Description ==
Male. Upper.side. Forewing black, usually more densely black than in Tagiades menaka, markings similar except for two extra spots, one below the cell spot at the origin of vein 5, and the other in the middle of first median interspace, bringing the four spots (including the sub-costal spot) into a slightly curved Hue. Hindwing with the white space generally smaller than in T. menaka, the marginal spots similar, the two black spots within the white space absent. Underside. Forewing paler, markings as above, Hindwing like the underside of menaka, the black spots larger; palpi, legs, head and body above and below similar. Female similar to the male, the semi-hyaline spots on the forewing and the black spots on the hindwing larger, the two large black spots on the inner side of the black apical band half inside the white space as in the female of T. menaka.

— Charles Swinhoe, Lepidoptera Indica. Vol. X

The larvae feed on Dioscorea oppositifolia, Dioscorea alata and Smilax species.

== Gallery ==
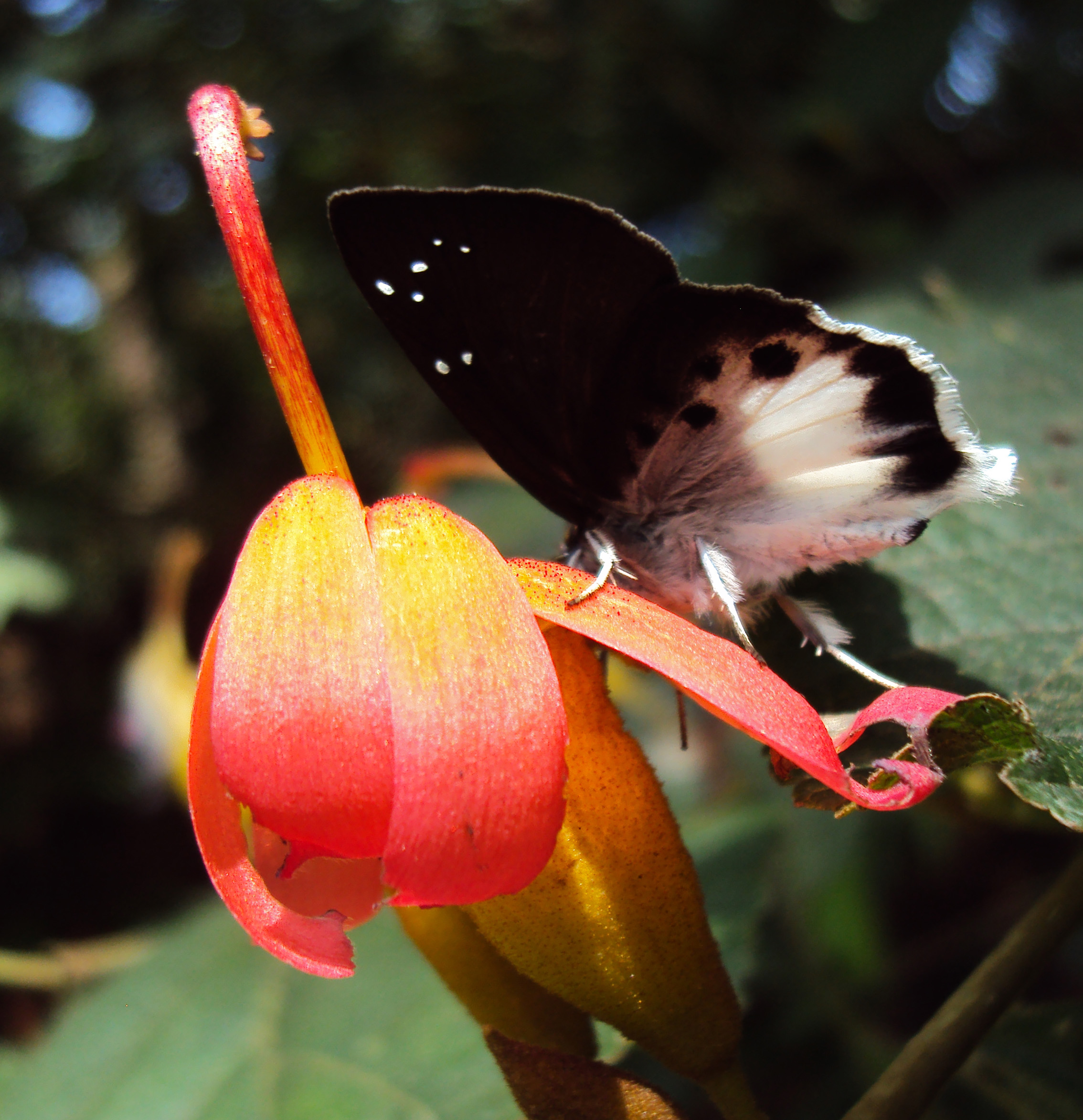
Ventral view

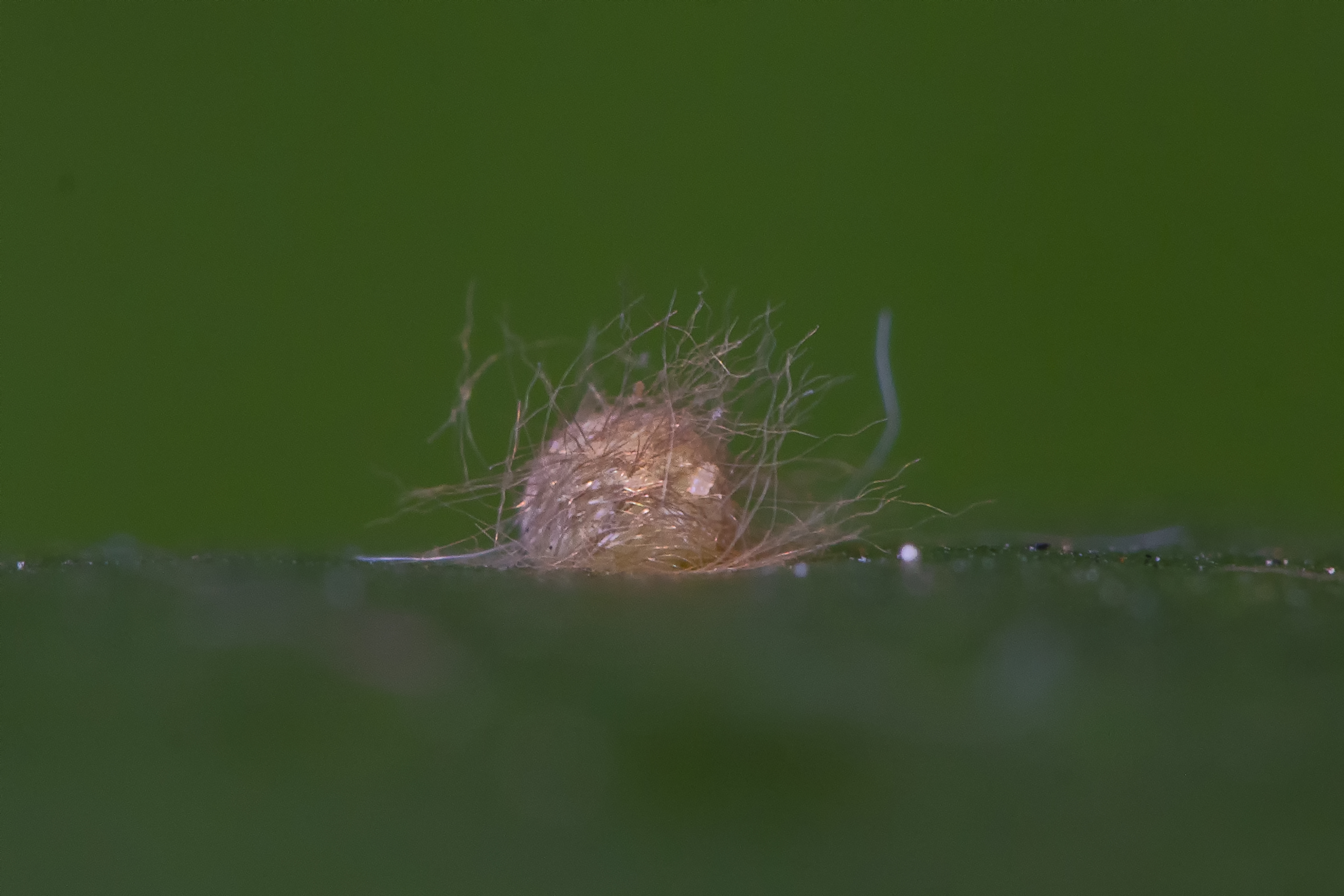
Egg

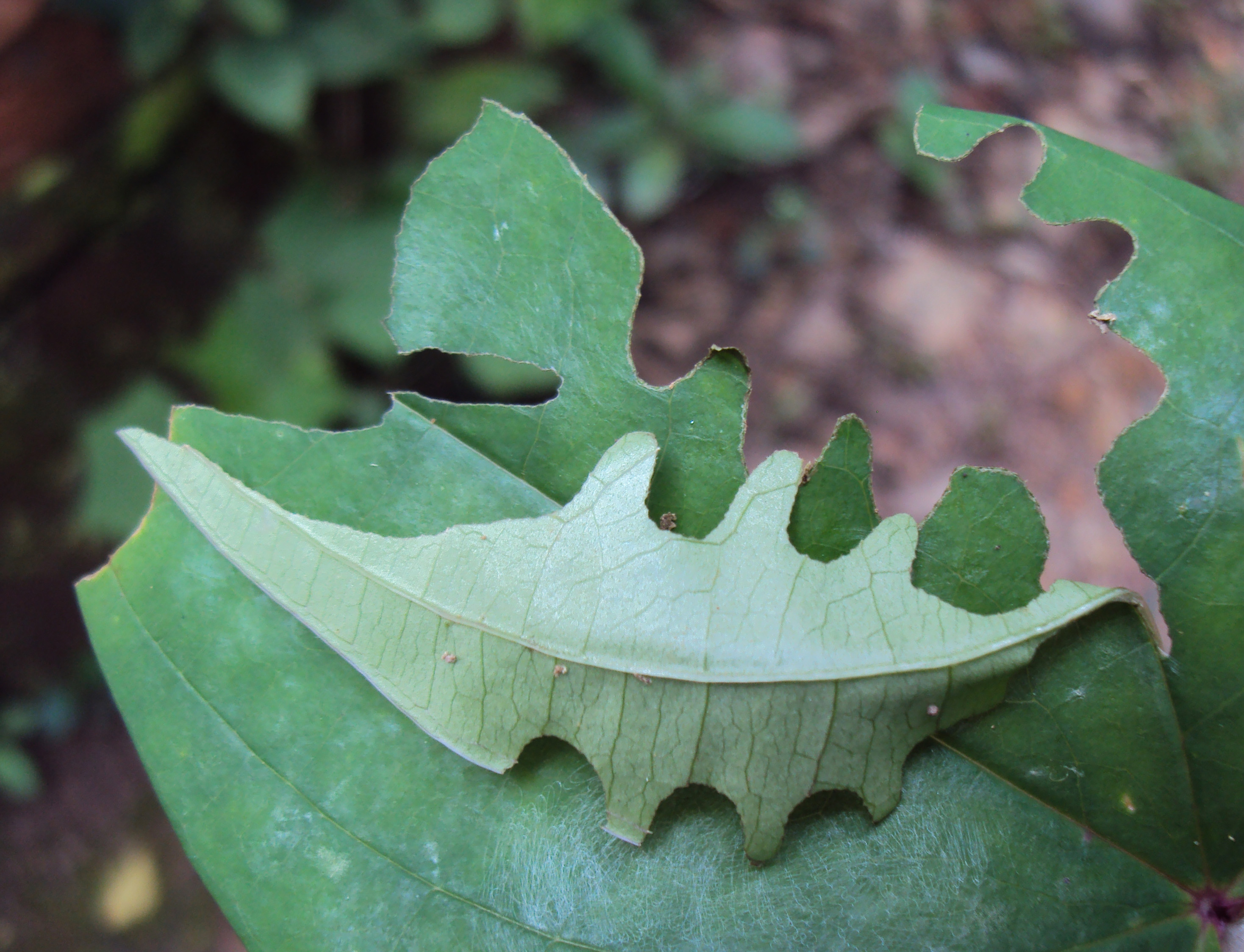
Larva case

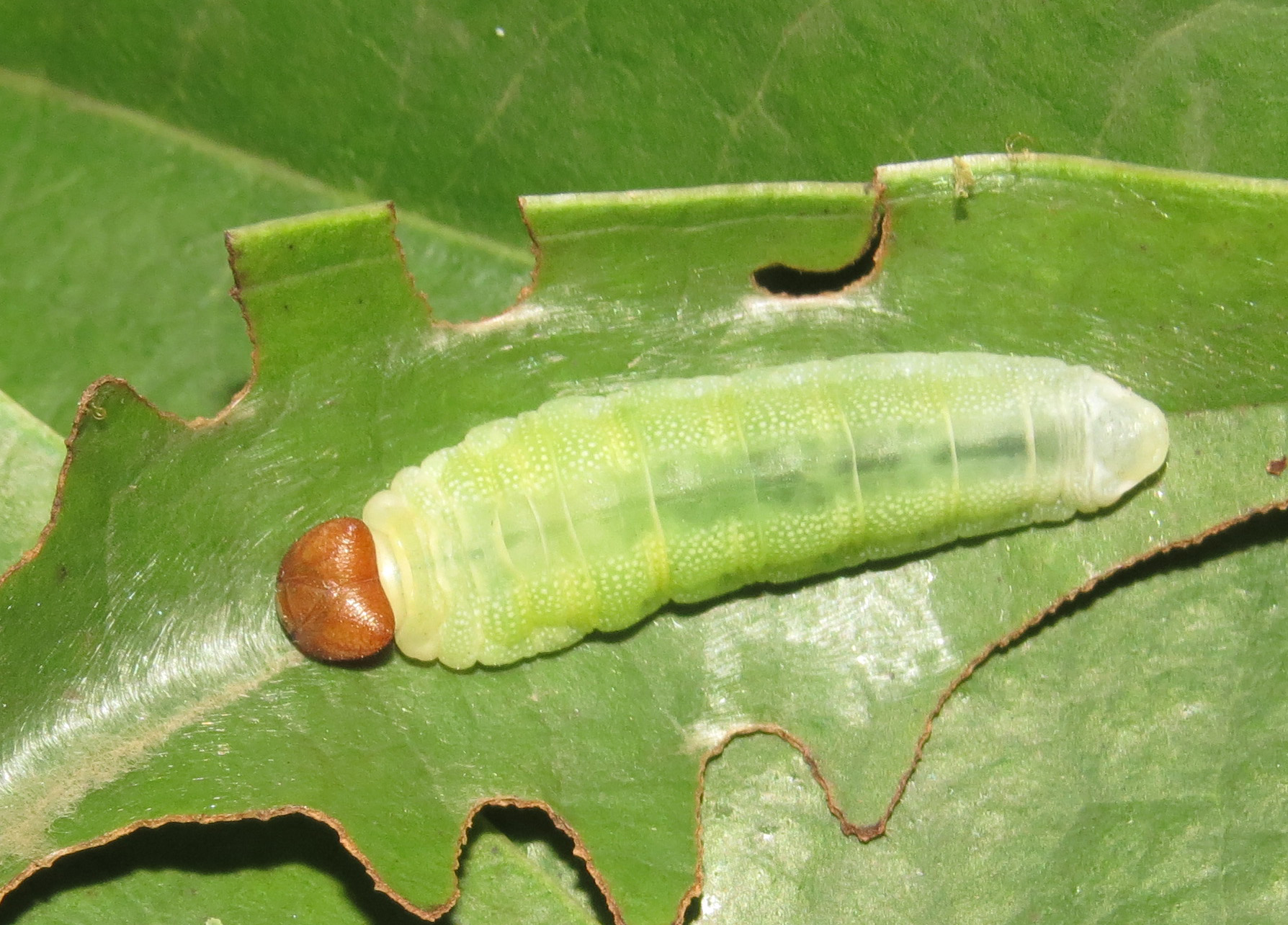
Larva

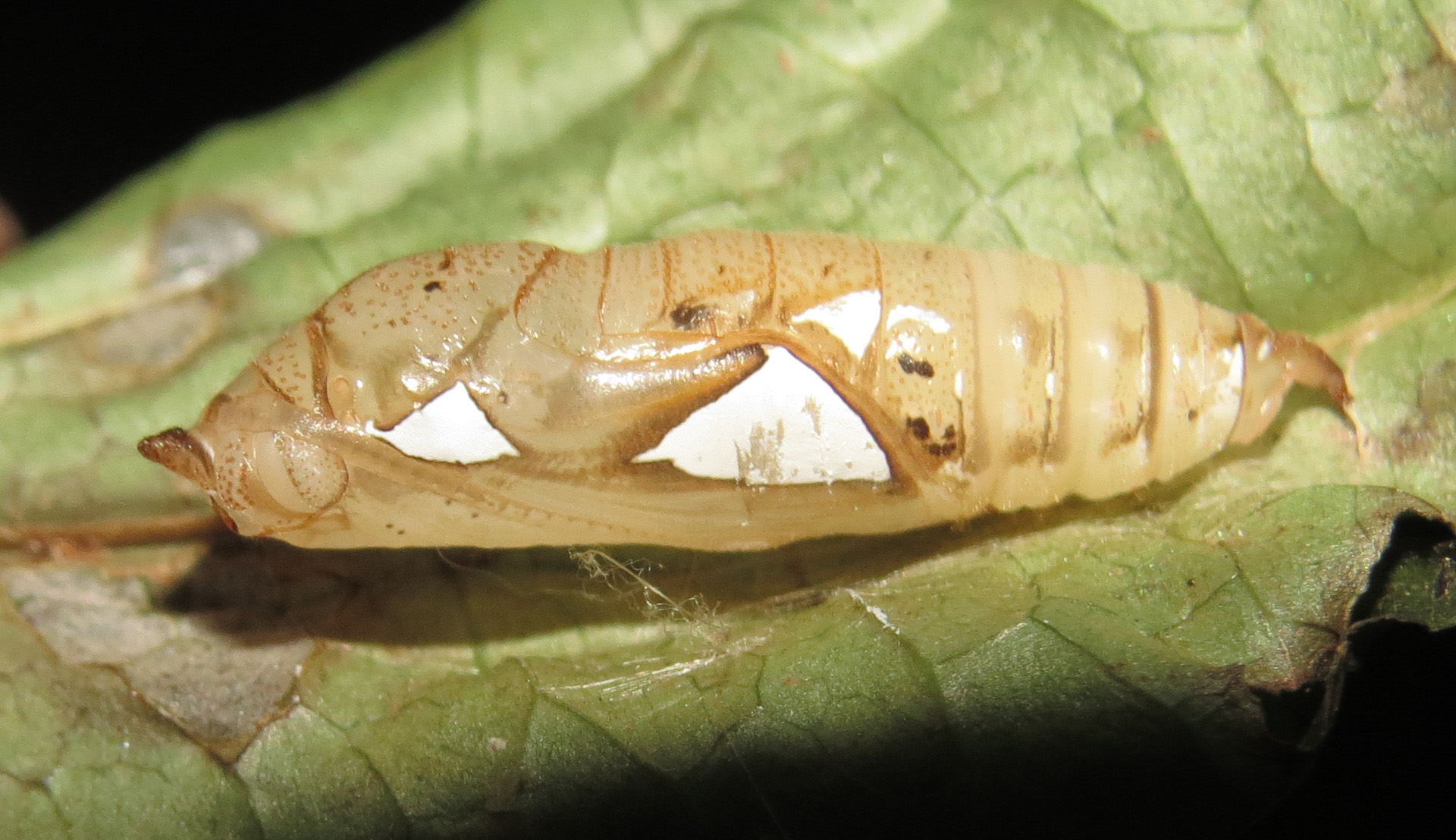
Pupa
