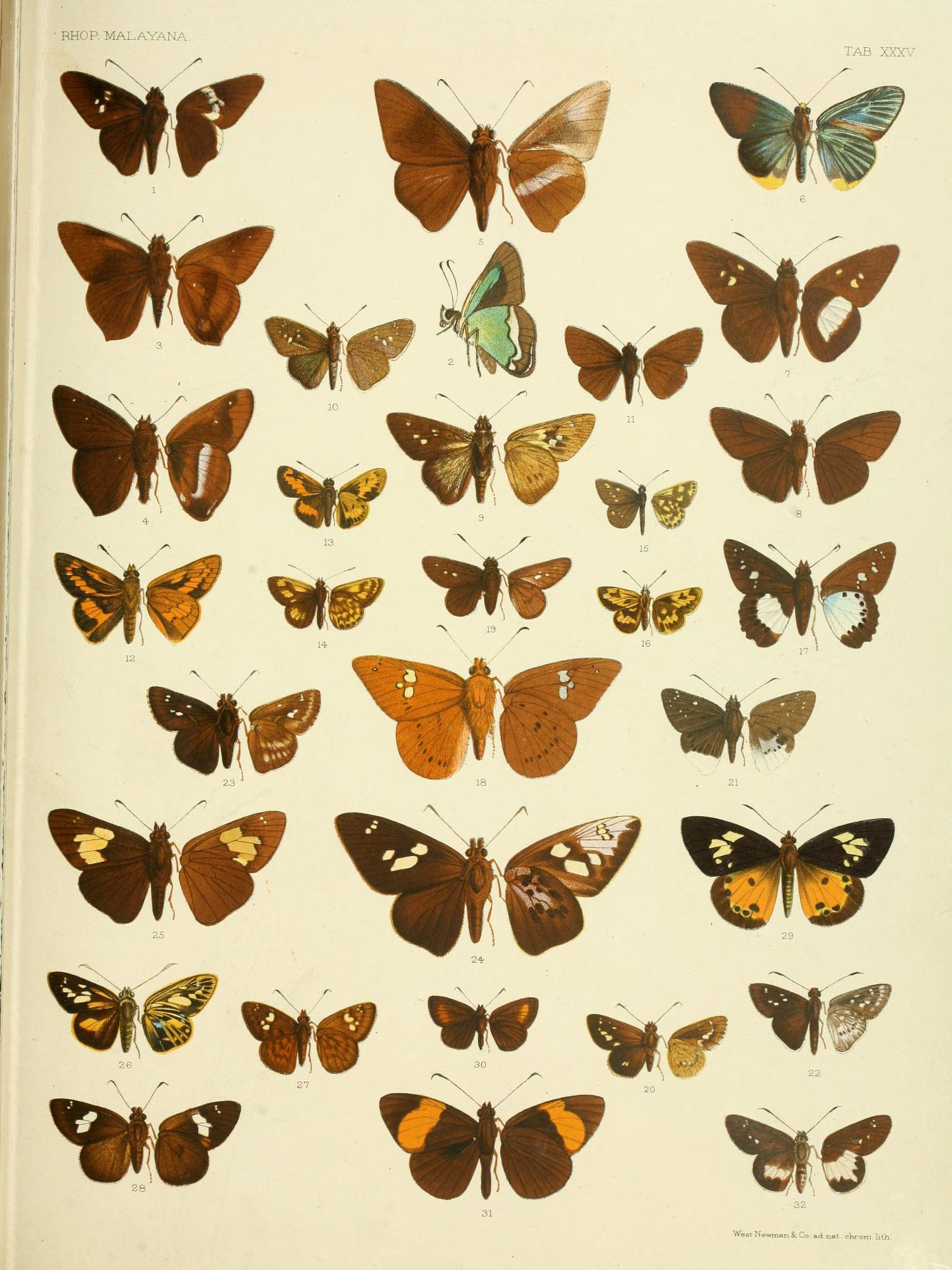
- Tagiades calligana in Rhopalocera Malayana (figure 6)

Scientific classification
- Domain: Eukaryota
- Kingdom: Animalia
- Phylum: Arthropoda
- Class: Insecta
- Order: Lepidoptera
- Family: Hesperiidae
- Genus: Tagiades
- Species: T. calligana

Binomial name
- Tagiades calligana Butler, 1879

Synonyms
- Tagiades caligana yapatha Fruhstorfer, 1910

= Tagiades calligana =

Species of butterfly

Tagiades calligana is a species of spread-winged skipper butterflies in the genus Tagiades. It is found in the Indomalayan realm in Thailand, Malay Peninsula, Singapore, Borneo, Sumatra, Java, Nias, Belitung, and Bangka.
