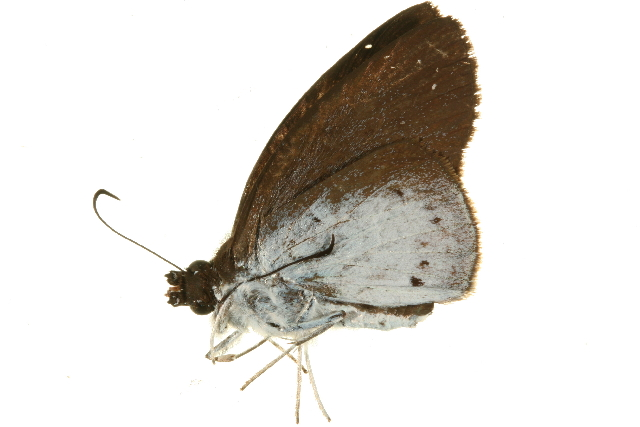

Scientific classification
- Kingdom: Animalia
- Phylum: Arthropoda
- Class: Insecta
- Order: Lepidoptera
- Family: Hesperiidae
- Genus: Tagiades
- Species: T. samborana

Binomial name
- Tagiades samborana Grose-Smith, 1891

= Tagiades samborana =

Species of butterfly

Tagiades samborana is a butterfly in the family Hesperiidae. It is found on Madagascar and the Comoro Islands. The habitat consists of forests.

== Subspecies ==
- Tagiades samborana samborana (Madagascar)
- Tagiades samborana rana Evans, 1937 (Comoro Islands: Anjouan)
