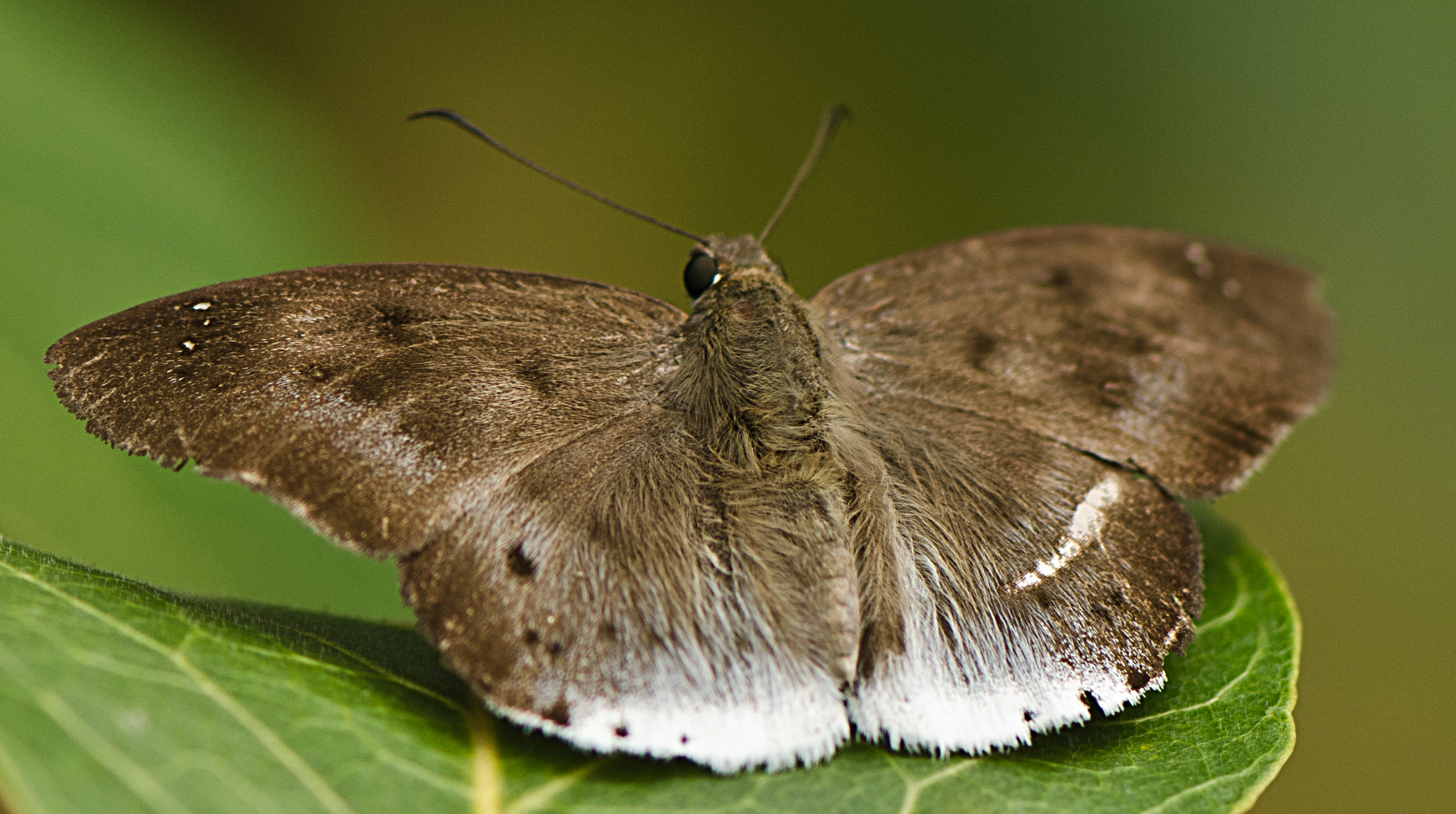
- Tagiades japetus obscurus from Kerala

Scientific classification
- Kingdom: Animalia
- Phylum: Arthropoda
- Clade: Pancrustacea
- Class: Insecta
- Order: Lepidoptera
- Family: Hesperiidae
- Genus: Tagiades
- Species: T. japetus

Binomial name
- Tagiades japetus (Stoll, 1782)

Synonyms
- List: Tagiades jepetus (Stoll, [1781]); Papilio japetus Stoll, [1781]; Tagiades janetta Butler, 1870; Tagiades clericus Butler, 1882; Tagiades kowaia Plötz, 1885; Tagiades gamelia Miskin, 1889; Tagiades australensis Mabille, 1891; Tagiades tindalii Ribbe, 1899; Tagiades bubasa Swinhoe, 1904; Tagiades hovia Swinhoe, 1904; Tagiades louisa Swinhoe, 1907; Tagiades fergussonius Fruhstorfer, 1910; Tagiades inconspicua Rothschild, 1915; Tagiades vulcania Evans, 1934; Hesperia atticus Fabricius, 1793; Tagiades utanus Plötz, 1885; Tagiades yotissa Fruhstorfer, 1910; Tagiades rajaghra Fruhstorfer, 1910; Pterygospidea japetus ravi Moore, [1866]; Tagiades lugens Mabille, 1883; Tagiades khasiana Moore, 1884; Tagiades epicharmus Fruhstorfer, 1910; Tagiades obscurus Mabille, 1876; Tagiades distans Moore, [1881]

= Tagiades japetus =

Pied flat

Species of butterfly

Tagiades japetus, commonly known as the pied flat or the common snow flat, is a species of spread-winged skipper butterfly belonging to the family Hesperiidae. It is widely distributed, being found from India, the Himalayas, Southeast Asia, to Australia. It contains several recognized subspecies.

== Description ==
Male. Upperside fuliginous-brown. Forewing with three minute subapical white dots, one of them, sometimes two of them, often absent; a minute dot at the end of the cell, another near the base of the second median interspace, and a third below it, in the middle of the first median interspace, sometimes one, sometimes two of them only present, sometimes all are wanting. Hindwing with indications of a curved discal series of spots darker than the ground colour, often altogether invisible. Cilia of both wings brown. Underside. Forewing paler than it is above, the hinder marginal area and a broad squarish patch at the hinder angle paler than the rest of the wing, the minute dots as above. Hindwing greyish-white, the costal and outer marginal areas somewhat suffused with brown; a curved series of dark brown discal spots, the lower ones usually mere dots, often invisible. Female. Upperside coloured like the male, but the shade of colour more variable in different examples in this sex than it is in the male, the sub-apical dots often larger (not always) and generally three in number; the spots in the disc much larger, the one at the end of the cell round, the outer spot near the base of the second median interspace usually conical, the one below it the largest and quadrate and two small spots lietween it and the hinder margin. Hindwing with an obscure blackish spot at the end of the cell and a discal series, all of them very indistinct in many examples. Underside. Forewing somewhat paler than the upperside, markings similar. Hindwing usually much darker grey, sometimes blue-grey, a small hlack dot at the end of the cell, in some examples a complete discal irregular series of black spots, but very variable in its prominence, and in many examples no better indicated than it is in the male; head and body above concolorous with the wings; palpi and body below concolorous with the hindwing.

— Charles Swinhoe, Lepidoptera Indica. Vol. X

== Life cycle and ecology ==
The eggs are laid on the upper surface of young leaves. They hatch in about six days, whereupon they will construct a leaf shelter by cutting the edge of a leaf, folding a triangular piece back, and then attaching it with silk. During the day, they hide under this shelter and only emerge at night to feed. The larvae feed on leaves of vines belonging to the genus Dioscorea; including Dioscorea transversa, Dioscorea alata, and Dioscorea numularia. They may make other shelters as they grow larger. After about 23 days, they pupate inside their final shelter, emerging as adults after 10 days. The adults are quick flyers, maintaining a height relatively close to ground, generally under large trees, often resting under the leaves. They are usually encountered resting underneath leaf surfaces. They feed on nectar from flowers during the morning. Mating is not seasonal and adults emerge all throughout the year. However, the population is greatest during the wet season.

== Distribution and habitat ==
Tagiades japetus have a wide range of occurrence. They are found from Sri Lanka and India to the Himalayas, and Indochina. They also occur throughout the Maritime Southeast Asia to the Philippines and down to Papua New Guinea and the surrounding islands, and northeastern Australia.

They are commonly found in the edges of rainforests, vine thickets, and sometimes in cultivated lands.

== Subspecies ==
Tagiades japetus contains several subspecies including the ones listed below with their common names and areas of distribution:

- Tagiades japetus atticus (Fabricius, 1793) – common snow flat (Madhya Pradesh to Bengal, Dehra Dun to Assam, Myanmar)
- Tagiades japetus avienus Fruhstorfer, 1910 – Key Island
- Tagiades japetus bandanus Fruhstorfer, 1910 – Banda Island
- Tagiades japetus brasidas Doherty, 1891 – Sumba, Indonesia
- Tagiades japetus engnanicus Fruhstorfer, 1910 – Enggano Island, western Sumatra
- Tagiades japetus janetta Butler, 1870 – black and white flat (northern gulf and north-eastern coast of Queensland, Aru Islands, Irian Jaya, Papua New Guinea, and Solomon Islands)
- Tagiades japetus japetus (Stoll, 1782) – Ambon, Maluku, Indonesia
- Tagiades japetus navus (Fruhstorfer, 1910) – Sula and Tukangbesi Islands
- Tagiades japetus obscurus Mabille, 1876 (Ceylon snow flat) – Sri Lanka, Nilgiris, Shevaroys, and the Palni Hills of southern India
- Tagiades japetus prasnaja Fruhstorfer, 1910 – Sulawesi, Banggai, and Selayar Island
- Tagiades japetus titus (Plötz, 1884) – Philippine common snow flat (endemic to the Philippines)
- Tagiades japetus xarea Mabille, 1891 – Timor
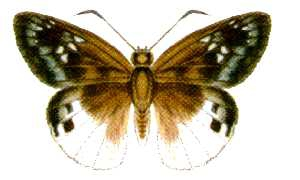
Tagiades japetus janetta

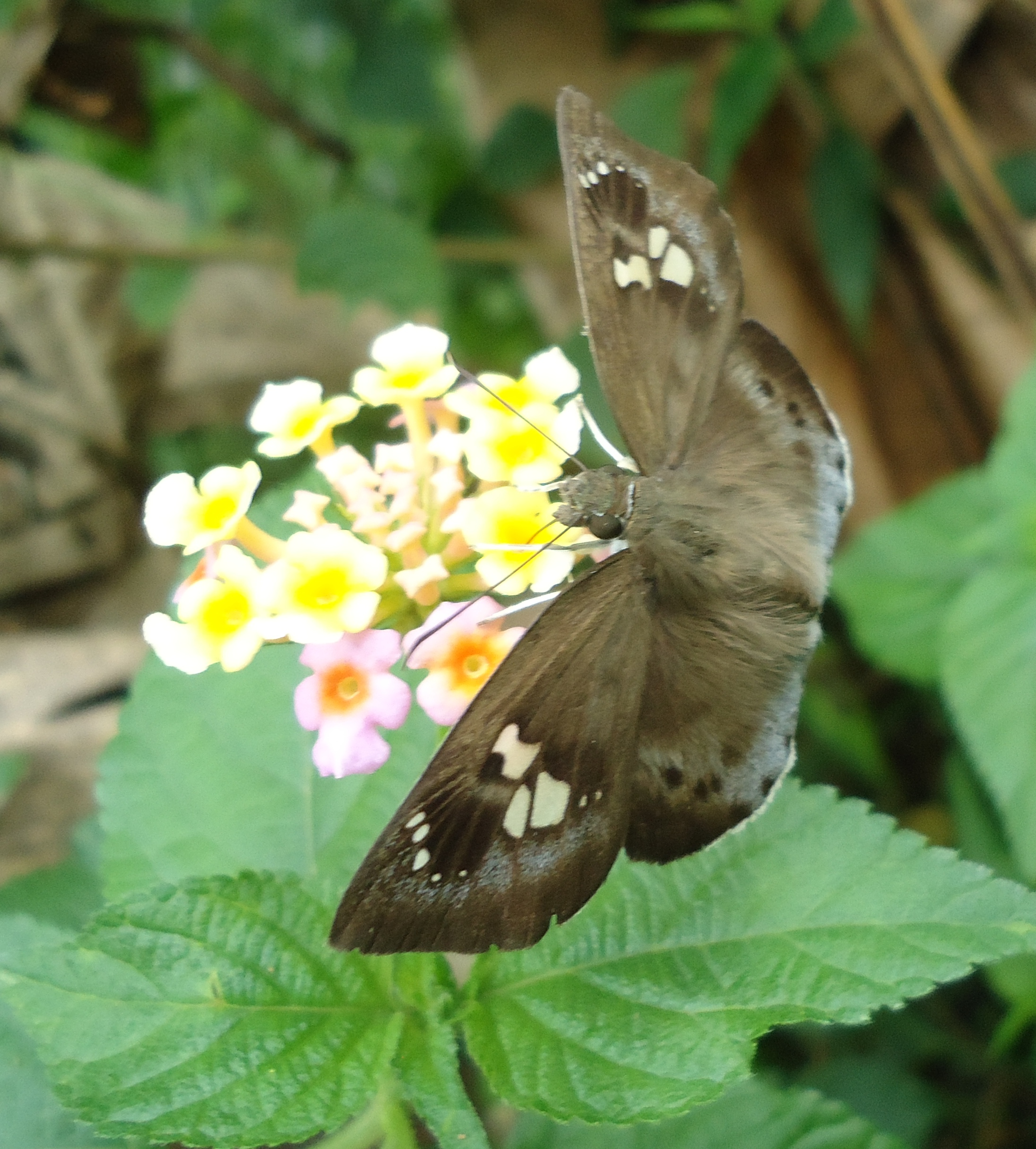
Tagiades japetus titus from the Philippines

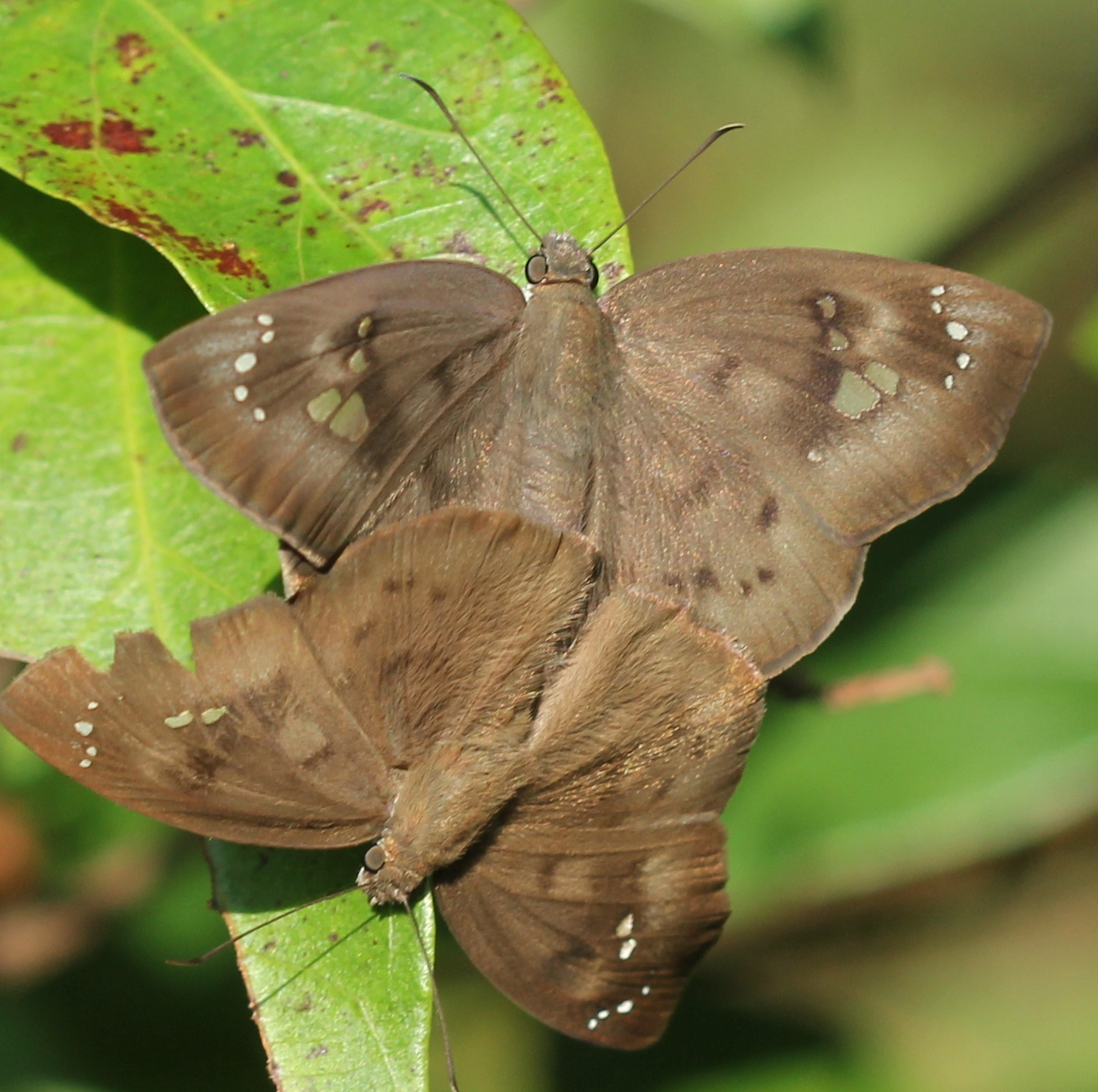
Tagiades japetus obscurus, mating
