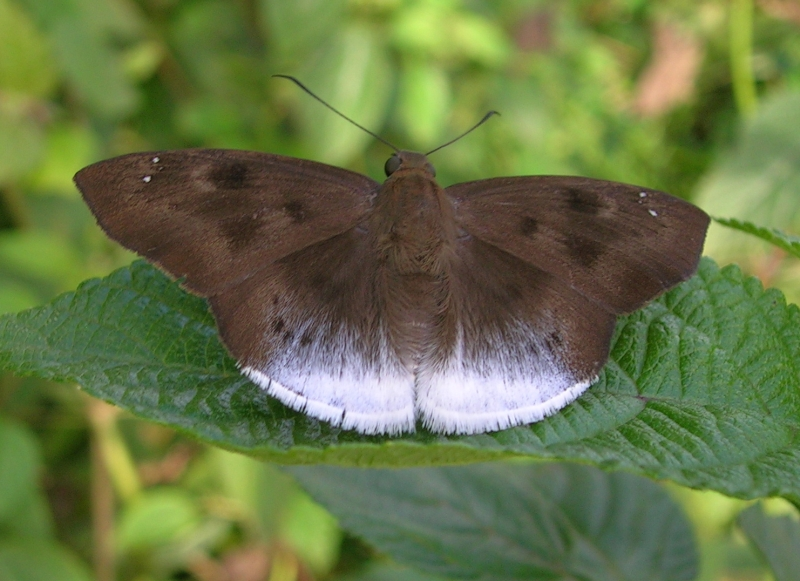
- Tagiades gana

Scientific classification
- Kingdom: Animalia
- Phylum: Arthropoda
- Clade: Pancrustacea
- Class: Insecta
- Order: Lepidoptera
- Family: Hesperiidae
- Tribe: Tagiadini
- Genus: Tagiades; Hübner, 1819

Species
- Several, see text

= Tagiades =

Snow flats

Genus of butterflies

Tagiades, commonly known as snow flats, is a genus of spread-winged skipper butterflies. It is the type genus of the tribe Tagiadini of the subfamily Pyrginae in the family Hesperiidae. It contains seventeen species; three are found in tropical Africa, while fourteen are found from India, Sri Lanka, Southeast Asia, northeast Australia, to the Pacific Islands. They are primarily diurnal butterflies, and can usually be found in secondary forests at up to 1,300 m (4,300 ft) above sea level. They can sometimes be encountered in partially cleared or cultivated areas. They are fast flyers, flying at an average height of 2 to 6 m (6.6 to 19.7 ft). They usually rest on the undersides of leaves. When disturbed they will fly away but will usually return to the preferred area, often to the same leaf.

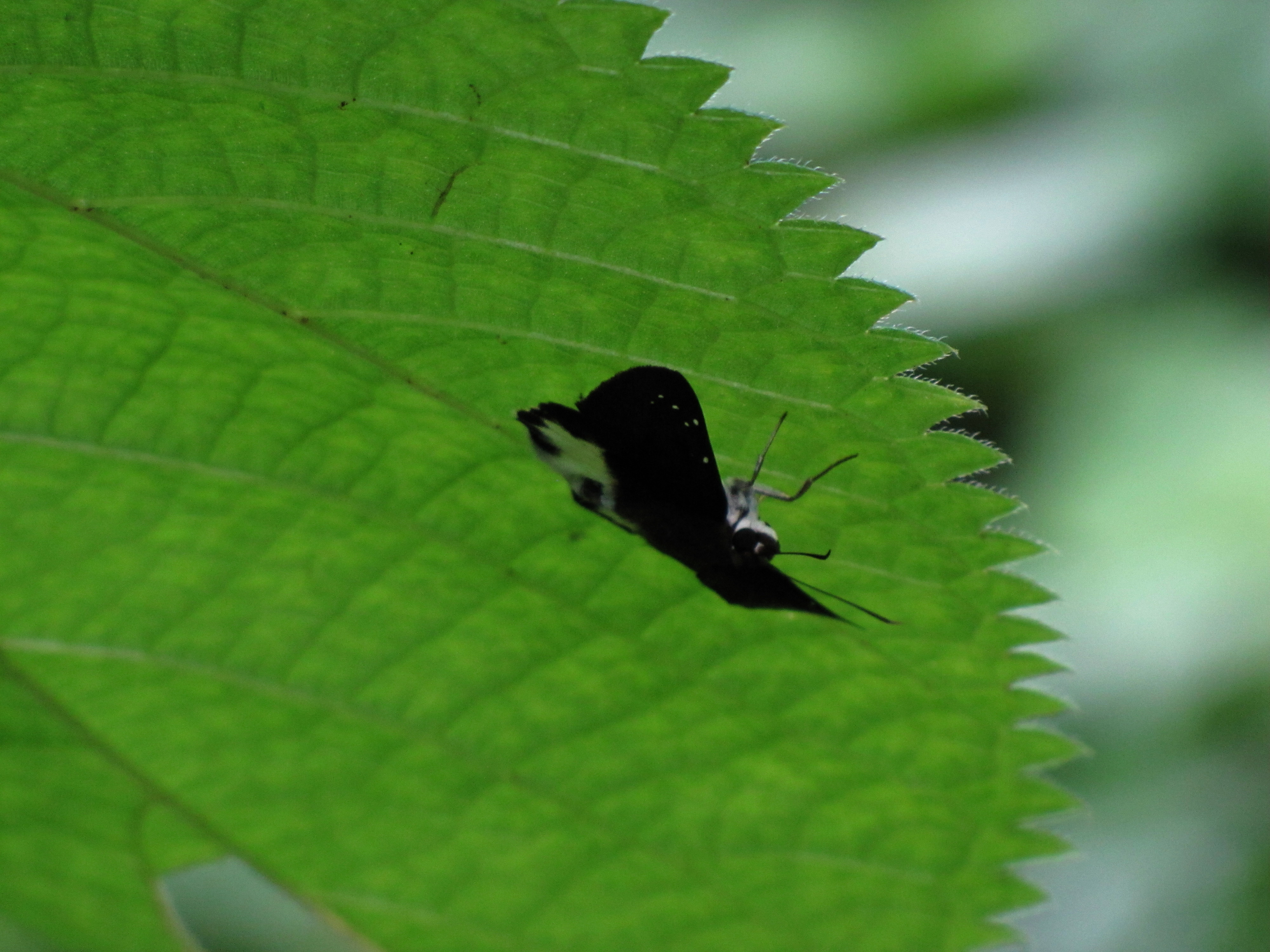
Tagiades litigiosa resting on the underside of a leaf

== Species ==
- Tagiades atticus (Fabricius, 1793)
- Tagiades calligana Butler, [1879] – Thailand, Malaysia, Sumatra, Singapore, Borneo, Java, Nias, Belitung, and Bangka Island
- Tagiades ceylonica Evans, 1932
- Tagiades cohaerens Mabille, 1914 – Malaysia, Burma, Thailand, the northwestern Himalayas, and possibly China
- Tagiades elegans Mabille, 1877
- Tagiades flesus (Fabricius, 1781) (clouded forester) – Transkei to Zimbabwe and Botswana in Africa
- Tagiades gana (Moore, [1866]) (large snow flat) – widespread in India, Indochina, and maritime Southeast Asia
- Tagiades hovia Swinhoe, 1904
- Tagiades hybridus Devyatkin, 2001 – central Vietnam
- Tagiades inconspicua Rothschild, 1915
- Tagiades insularis Mabille, 1876 – Madagascar
- Tagiades janetta Butler, 1870
- Tagiades japetus (Stoll, [1781]) (pied flat or common snow flat) – widespread in India, Indochina, maritime Southeast Asia, and north-eastern Australia
- Tagiades kina Evans, 1934
- Tagiades korela Mabille, 1891
- Tagiades lavata Butler, [1879] – southern Burma, Thailand, Malaysia, Borneo, Sumatra, Java, and the Natuna Islands
- Tagiades litigiosa Möschler, 1878 (water snow flat) – Sri Lanka, southern India, Assam, the Himalayas, and Indochina
- Tagiades martinus Plötz, 1884
- Tagiades menaka (Moore, [1866]) (dark edged snow flat or spotted snow flat) – Himalayas (from Kashmir to Assam), Indochina, and Hainan
- Tagiades neira Plötz, 1885
- Tagiades nestus (C. Felder, 1860) (Papuan snow flat) – Papua New Guinea, the Duke of York Island, and northern Australia
- Tagiades obscurus Mabille, 1876
- Tagiades parra Fruhstorfer, 1910 – Indochina and maritime Southeast Asia
- Tagiades presbyter Butler, 1882
- Tagiades ravi (Moore, [1866])
- Tagiades sambavana Elwes and Edwards, 1897
- Tagiades samborana Grose-Smith, 1891 – Madagascar
- Tagiades sem Mabille, 1883
- Tagiades sheba Evans, 1934
- Tagiades silvia Evans, 1934
- Tagiades titus Plötz, 1884
- Tagiades tethys (Ménétries, 1857) – eastern Asia including Japan, Taiwan and Korea
- Tagiades toba de Nicéville, [1896] – Assam to maritime Southeast Asia
- Tagiades trebellius (Hopffer, 1874) – Japan, the Philippines, and Sulawesi and the surrounding islands
- Tagiades tubulus Fruhstorfer, 1910
- Tagiades ultra Evans, 1932 – Indochina, maritime Southeast Asia, to Palawan in the Philippines
- Tagiades waterstradti Elwes & Edwards, 1897 – maritime Southeast Asia

== Gallery ==
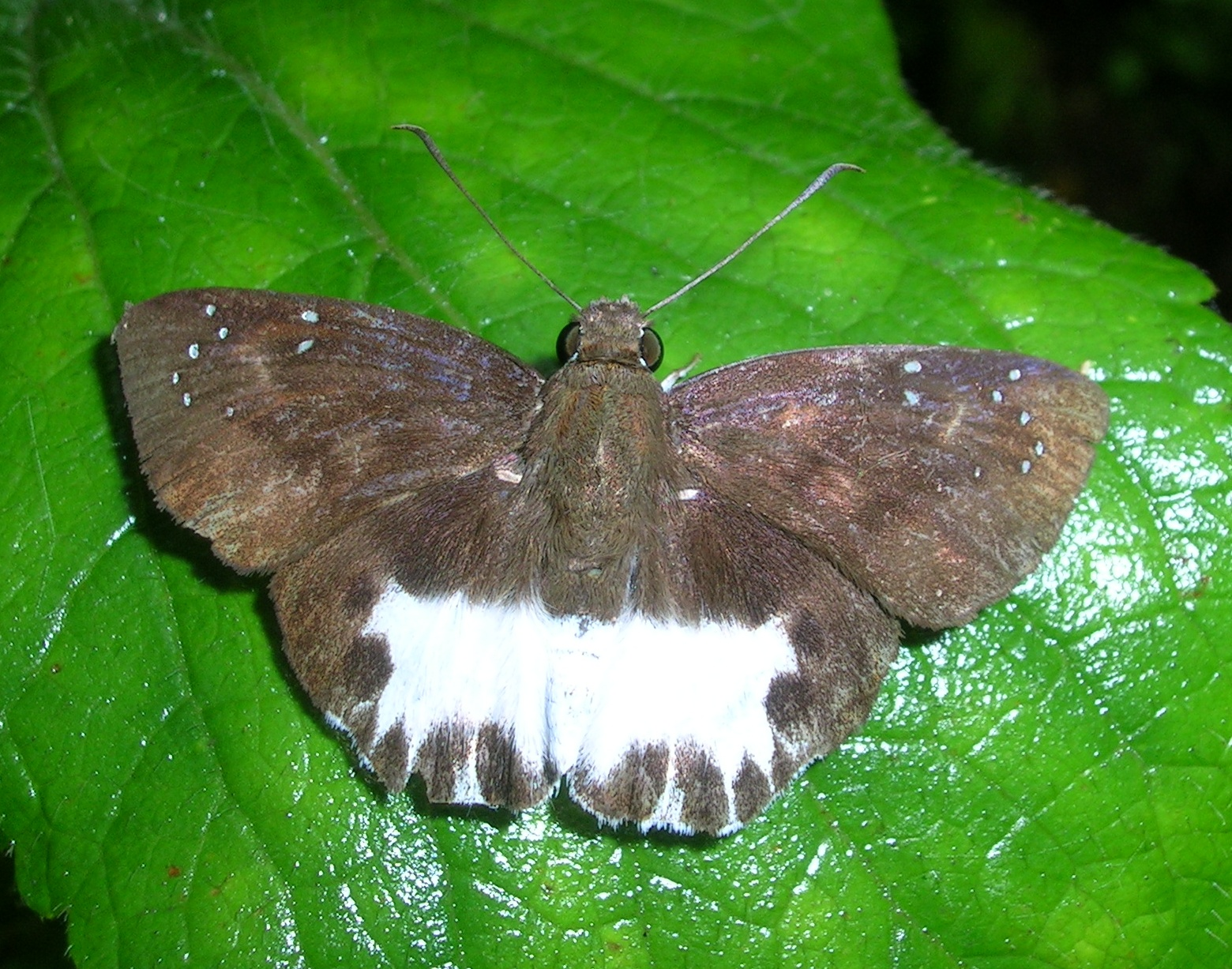
Tagiades litigiosa from India

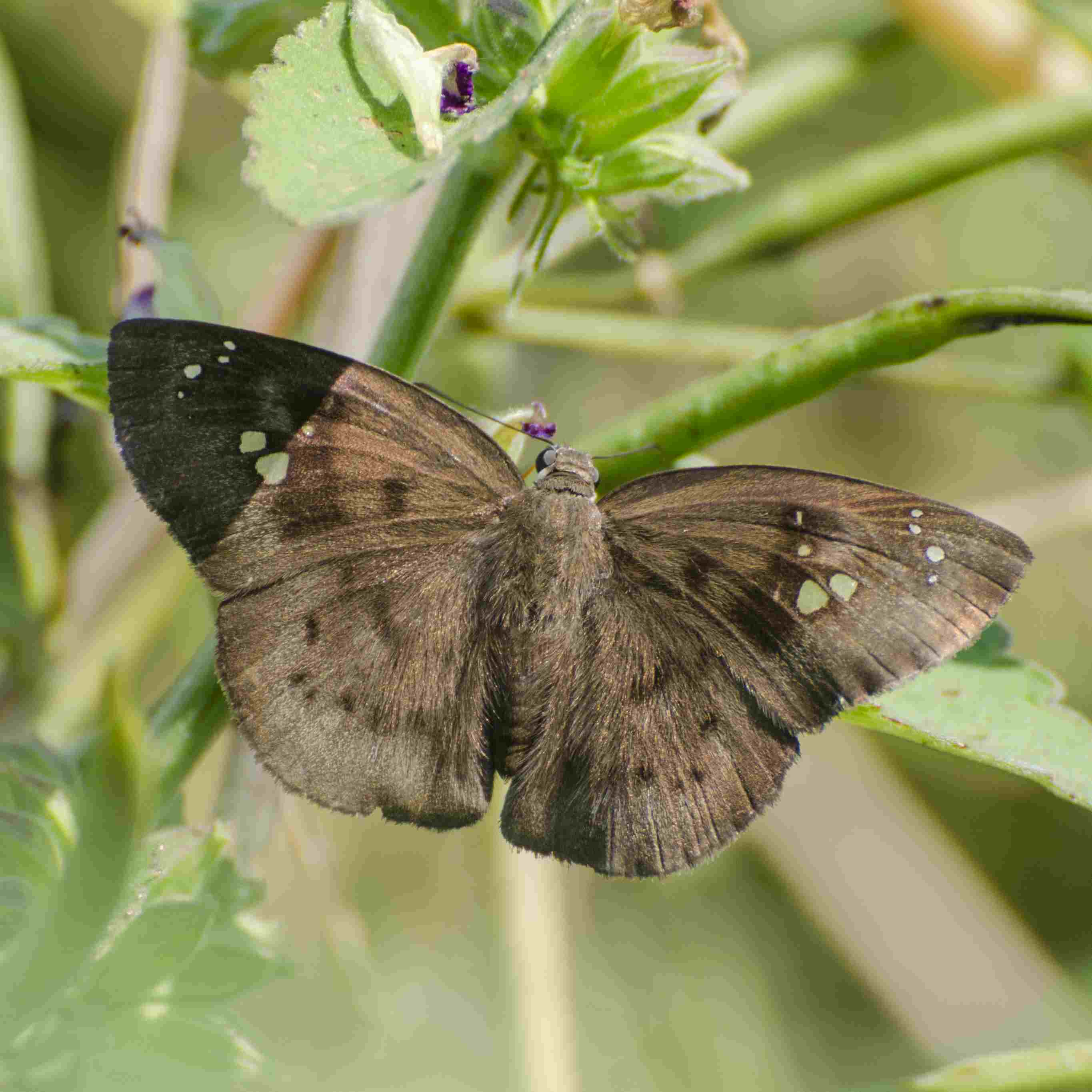
Tagiades japetus ravi from India

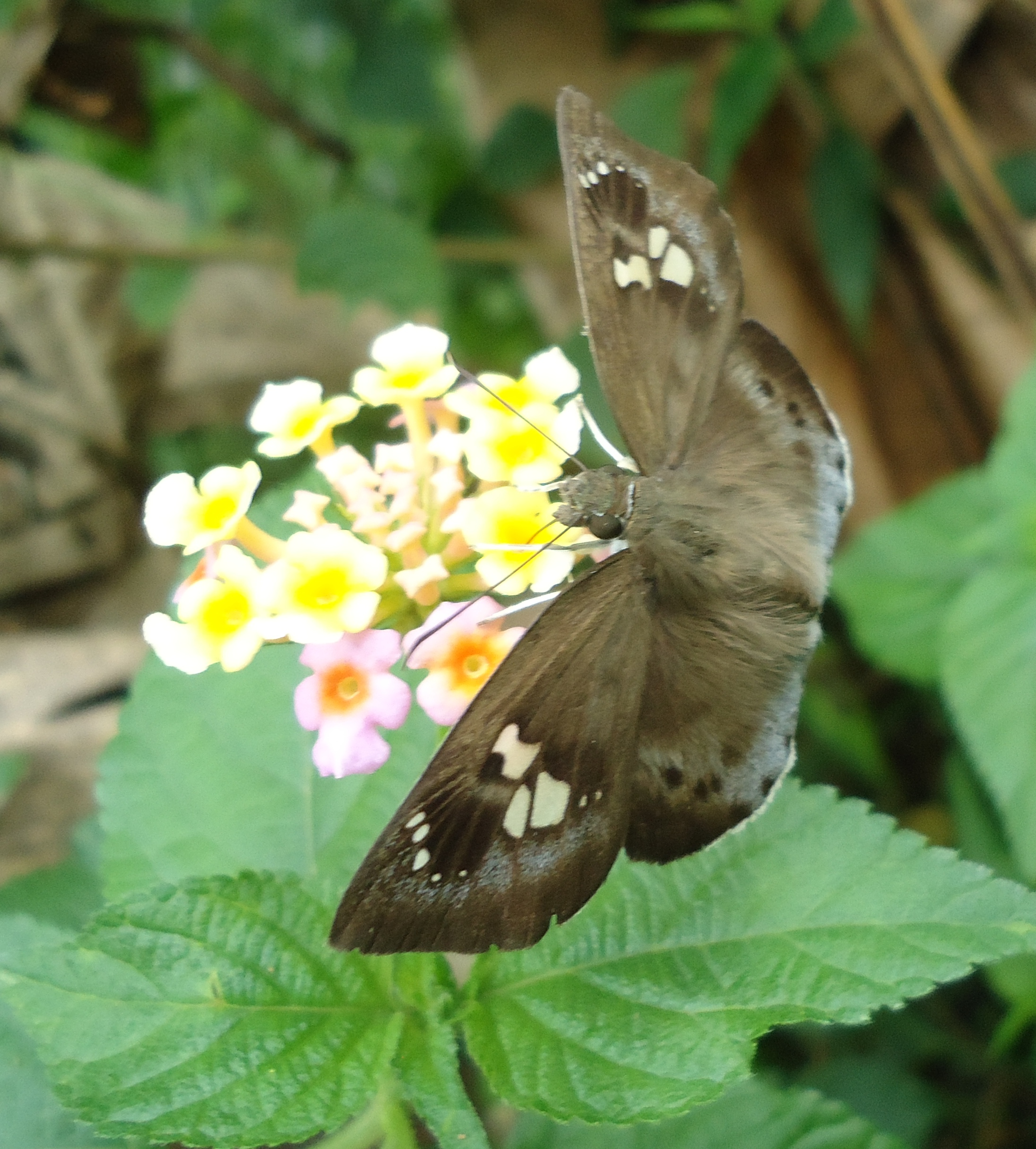
Tagiades japetus titus from the Philippines

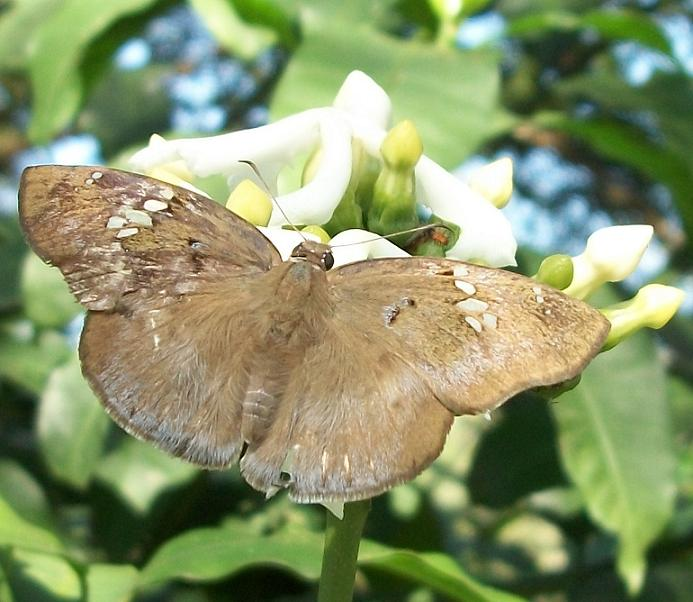
Tagiades flesus from South Africa
