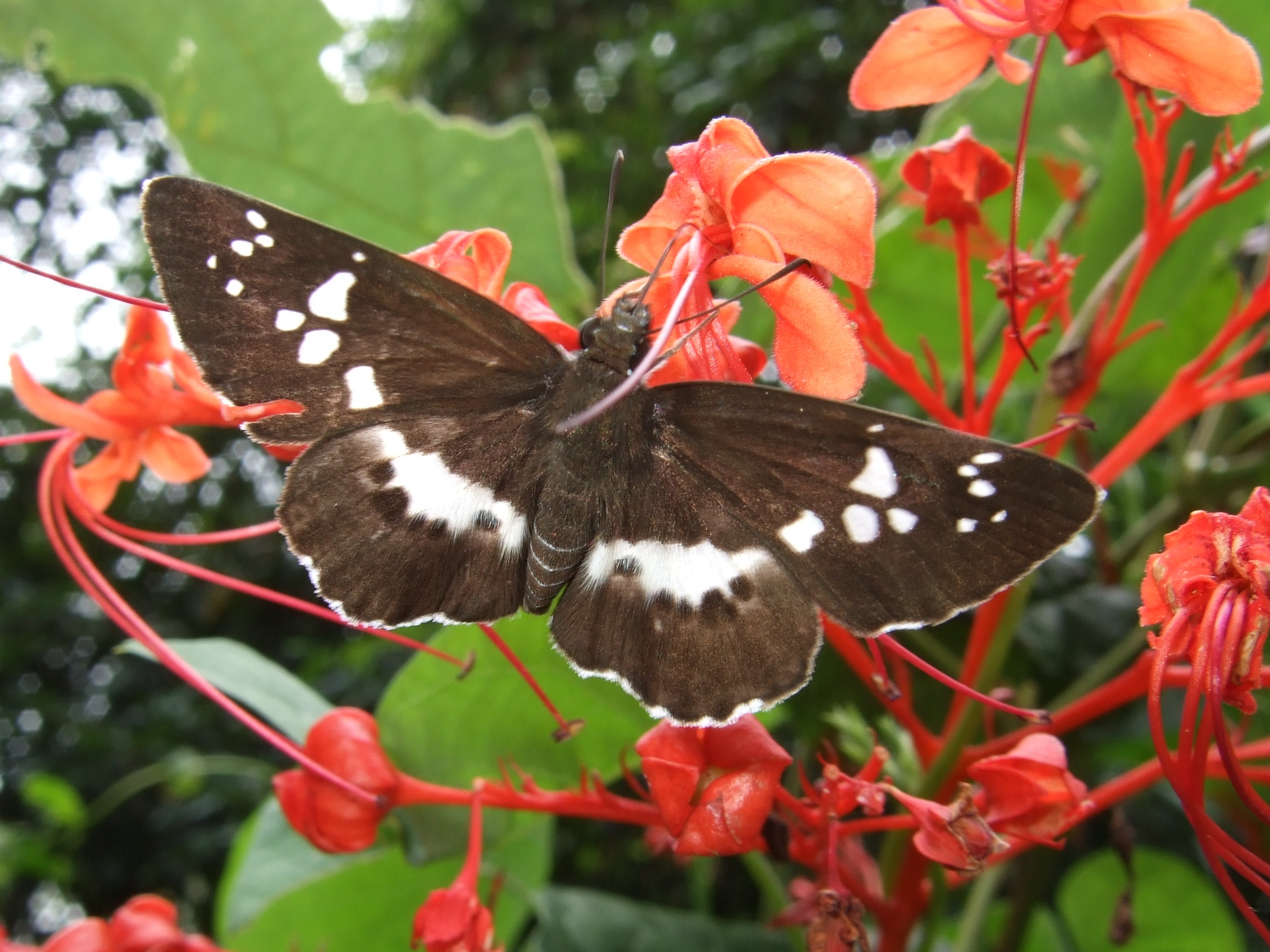

Scientific classification
- Kingdom: Animalia
- Phylum: Arthropoda
- Class: Insecta
- Order: Lepidoptera
- Family: Hesperiidae
- Genus: Tagiades
- Species: T. tethys

Binomial name
- Tagiades tethys (Ménétries, 1857)

Synonyms
- Pyrgus tethys Ménétries, 1857; Daimio lineata Mabille & Boullet, 1916; Daimio_tethys (Ménétries, 1857)

= Tagiades tethys =

Species of butterfly

Tagiades tethys is a species of butterfly of the family Hesperiidae. It is found in eastern Asia, including the Amur region, southern Ussuri, Japan, Taiwan and Korea. The wingspan is about 40 millimetres (1.6 in). The larvae feed on various plants, including Quercus mongolica, Dioscorea nipponica, Dioscorea butatas, Dioscorea japonica and Dioscorea japonica var. pseudojaponica.

== Subspecies ==
- Tagiades tethys tethys
- Tagiades tethys birmana (Yunnan)
- Tagiades tethys daiseni (Japan)
- Tagiades tethys roona
- Tagiades tethys moori
- Tagiades tethys niitakana
