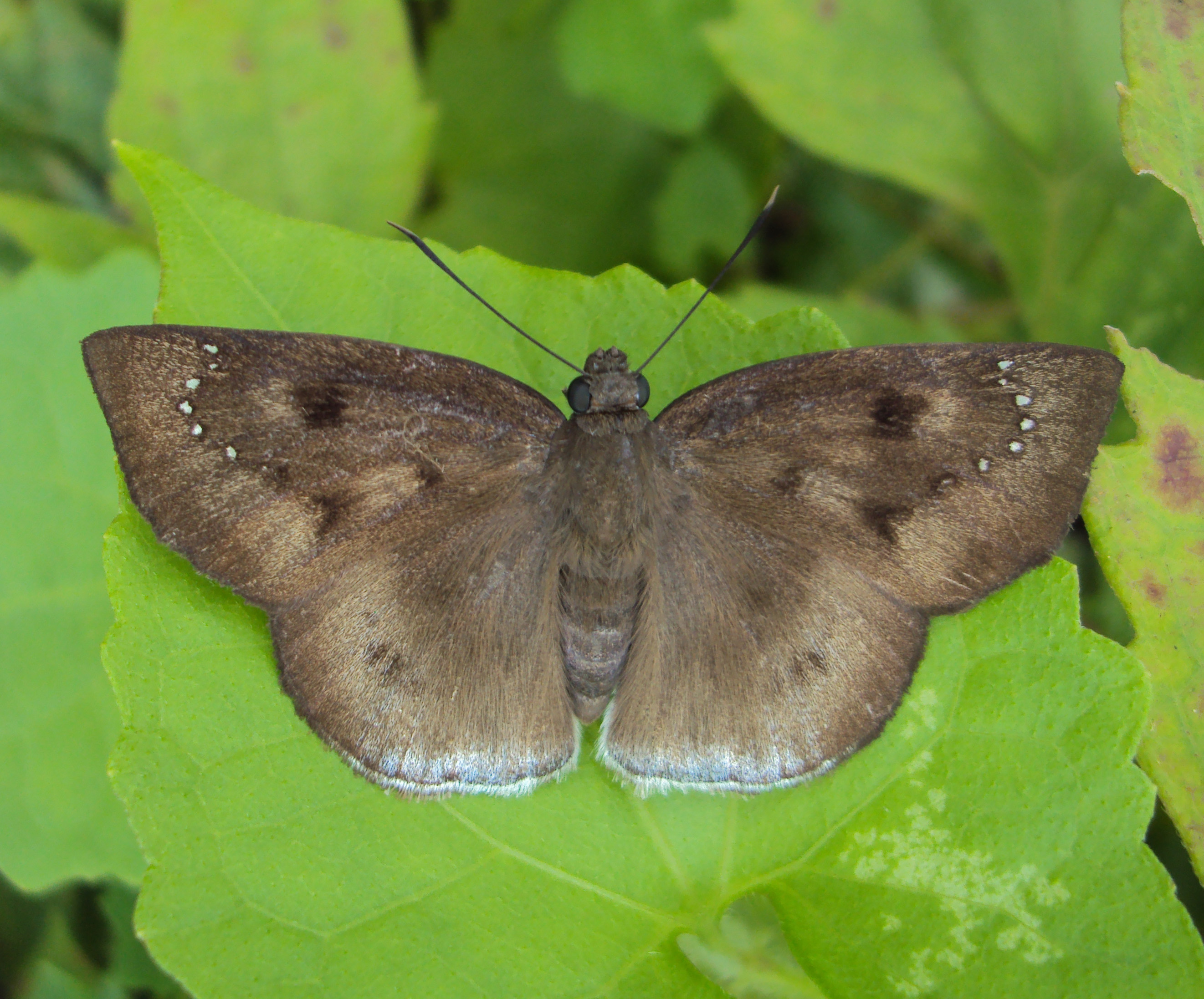
- Western Ghats specimen

Scientific classification
- Domain: Eukaryota
- Kingdom: Animalia
- Phylum: Arthropoda
- Class: Insecta
- Order: Lepidoptera
- Family: Hesperiidae
- Genus: Tagiades
- Species: T. gana

Binomial name
- Tagiades gana (Moore, 1865)

= Tagiades gana =

Suffused snow flat

Species of butterfly

Tagiades gana, the immaculate snow flat, large snow flat or suffused snow flat, is a butterfly belonging to the family Hesperiidae found in Indomalayan realm.

== Description ==
In 1891, Edward Yerbury Watson gave a detailed description:

Male and female have a dark brown ground colour. The male has on the upperside of the forewing, three minute semi-transparent spots obliquely before the apex; a transverse discal series of streaks, a small patch within the cell, one near the base of the wing, and exterior margin blackish; hindwing with the lower third pure white which is straightly separated from the brown of the basal portion; apical margin and three spots on the upper part of the disc, black, and two spots on the middle of the white anterior margin. Underside paler brown, semi-transparent spots on forewing as above: hindwing white suffused with brown along the anterior margin: upper discal and marginal spots as above black. Female paler. Upperside somewhat greyish-brown; forewing with spots and blackish discal streaks, and hindwing with upper discal spots as in male: exterior margin of hindwing greyish-white. Underside as in male. Cilia of both sexes pure white on the lower portion of the hindwing, the rest brown.

— E. Y. Watson

Dioscorea alata is a host plant for the larvae.

== Gallery ==
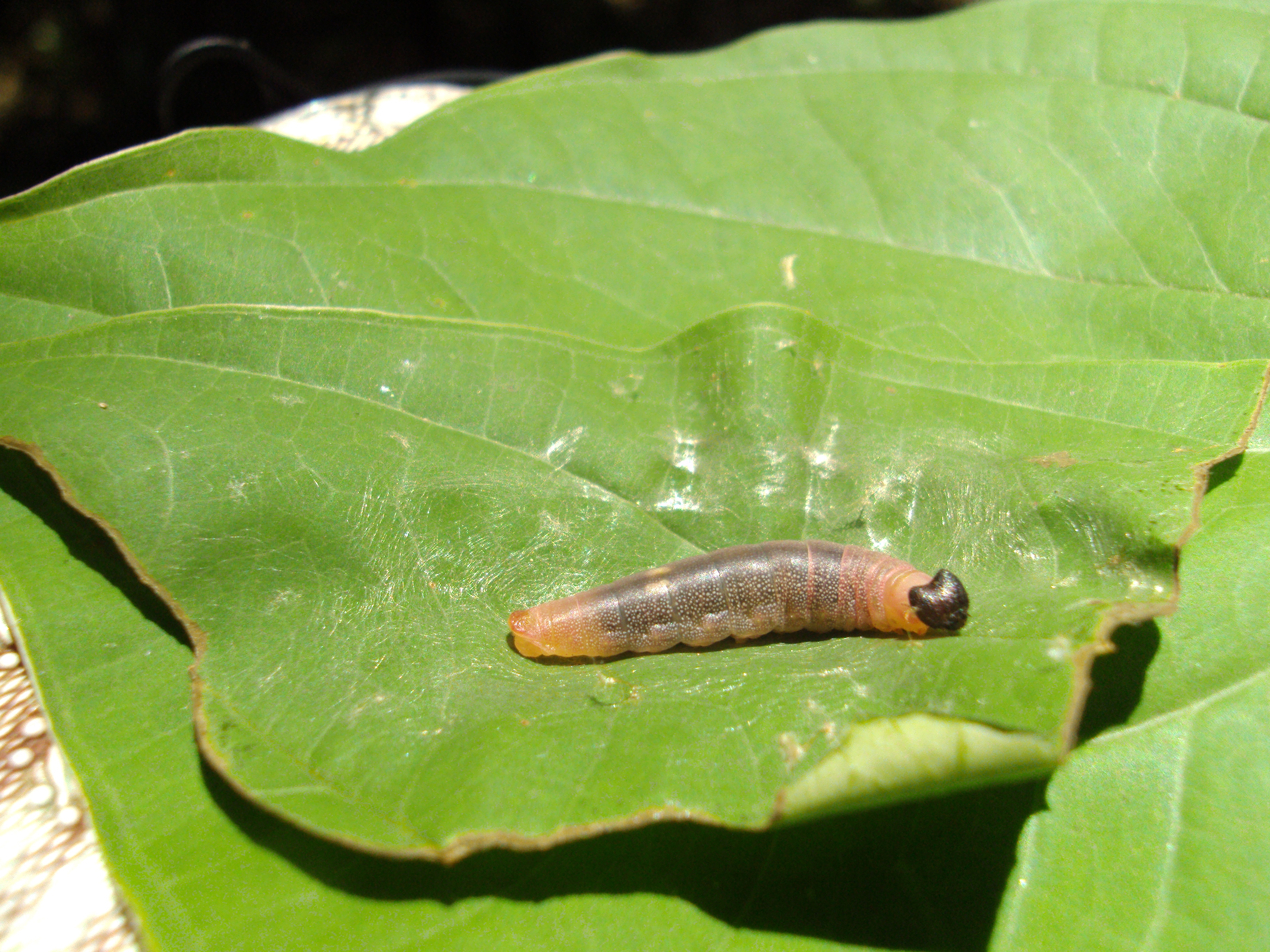
Larva on Dioscorea alata

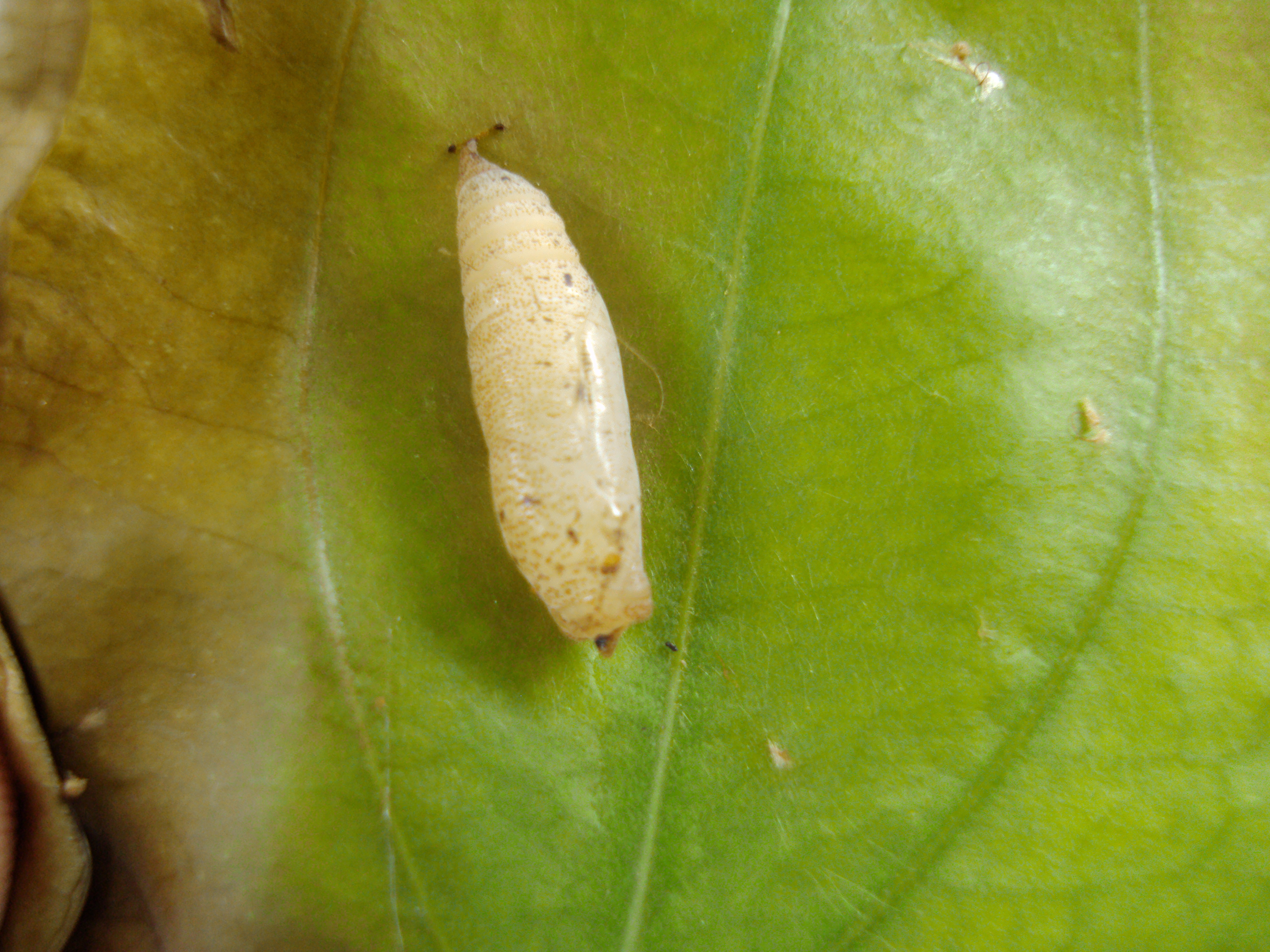
Pupa

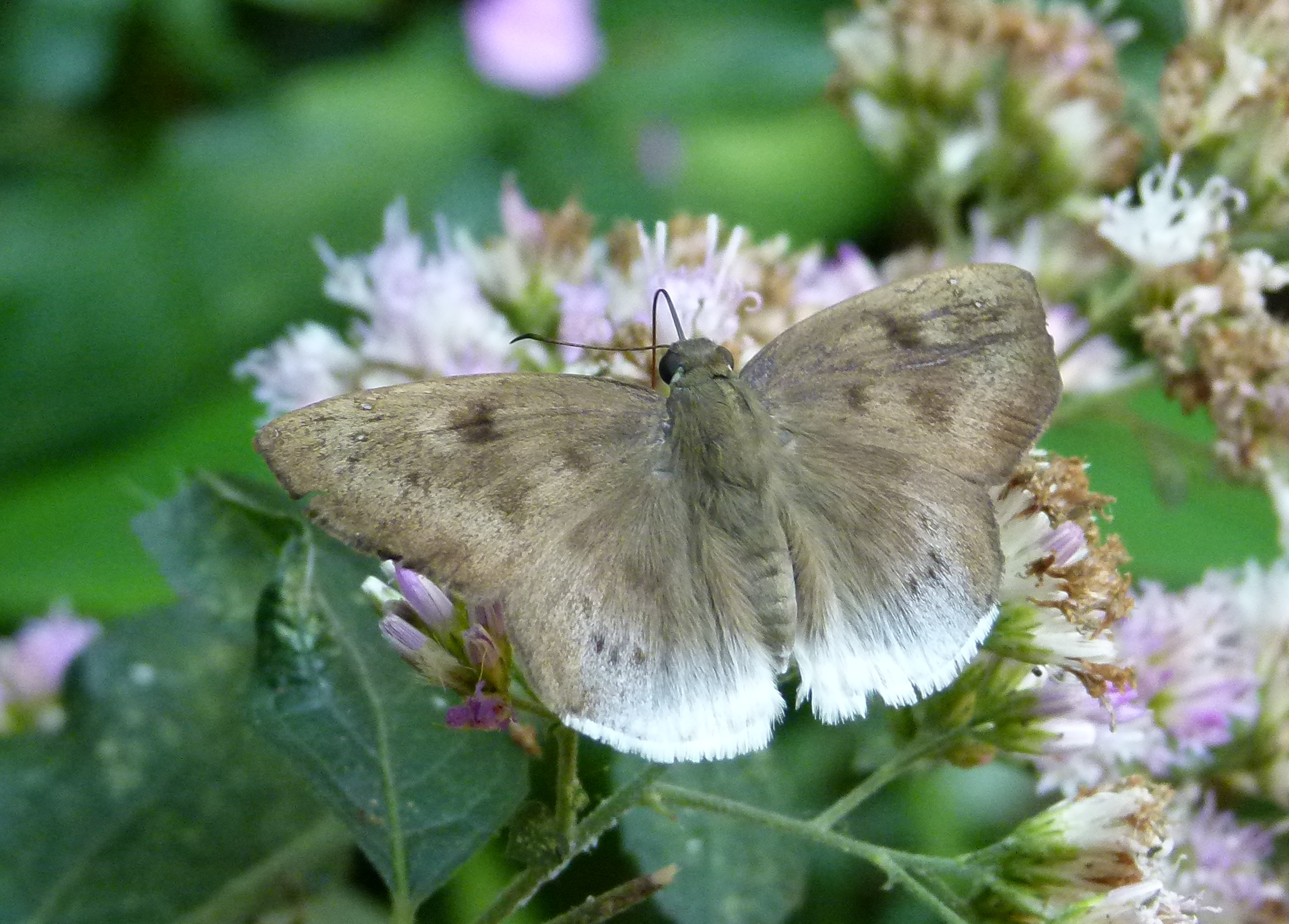
On flower

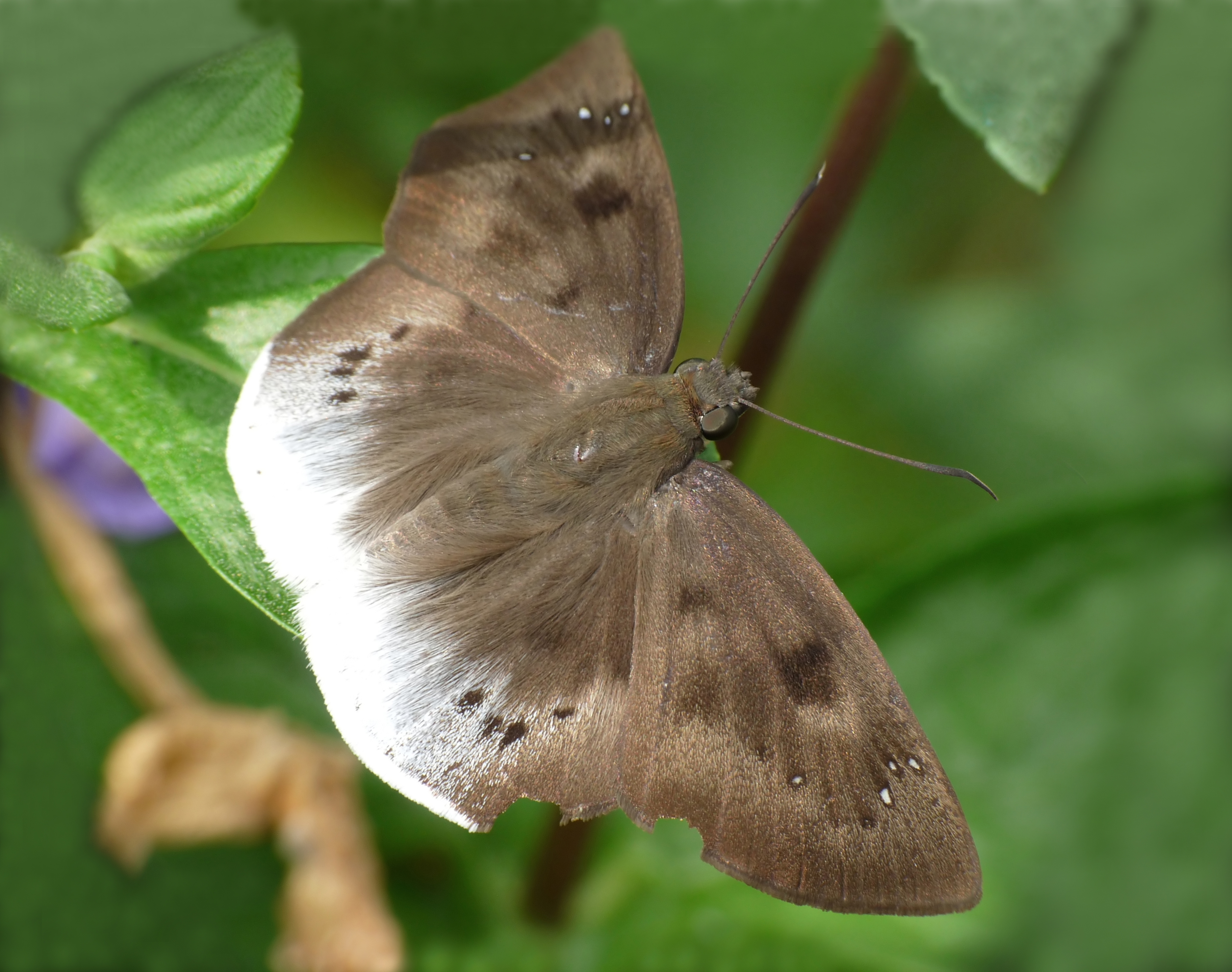
Basking

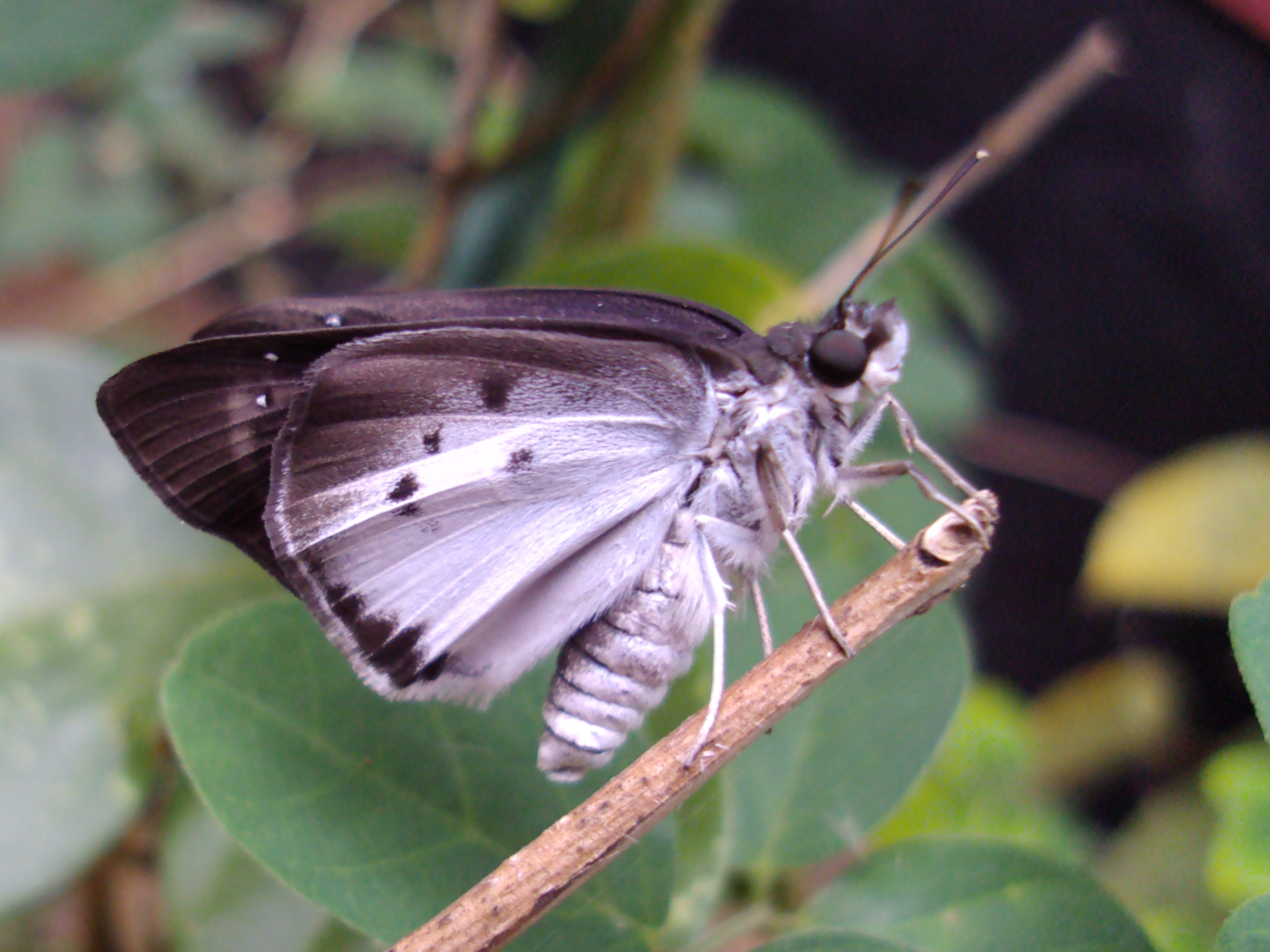
Underside

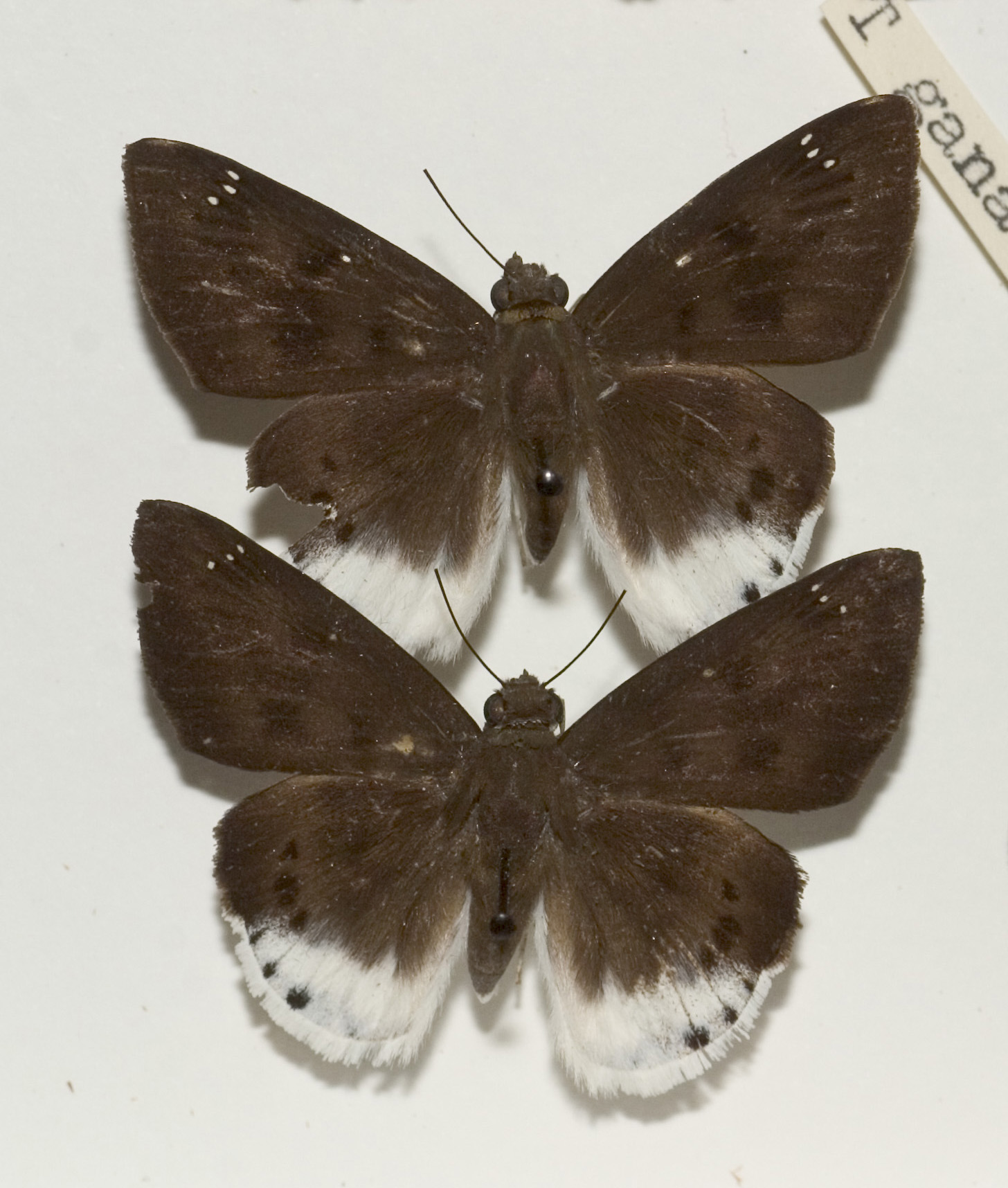
Museum specimens from Malaya
