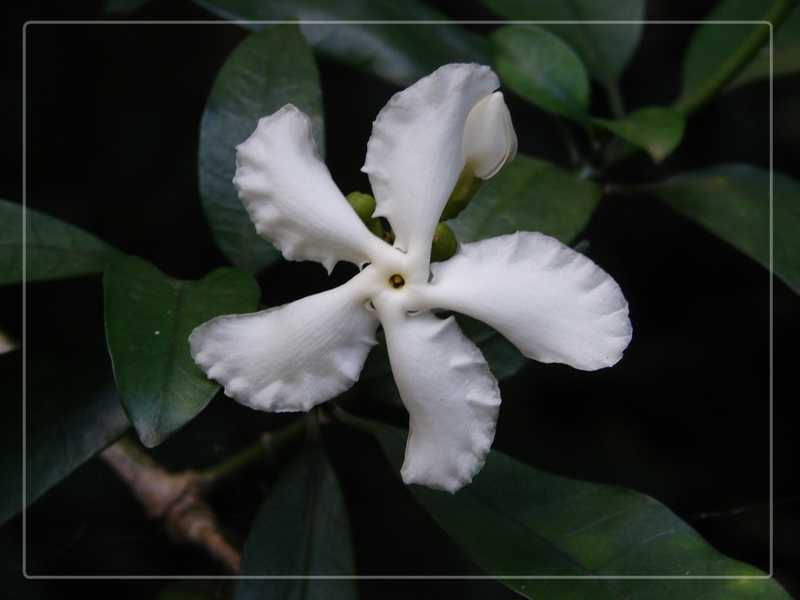

Conservation status
- Least Concern (IUCN 3.1)

Scientific classification
- Kingdom: Plantae
- Clade: Embryophytes
- Clade: Tracheophytes
- Clade: Spermatophytes
- Clade: Angiosperms
- Clade: Eudicots
- Clade: Asterids
- Order: Gentianales
- Family: Apocynaceae
- Genus: Tabernaemontana
- Species: T. ventricosa

Binomial name
- Tabernaemontana ventricosa Hochst. ex A.DC.

Synonyms
- Conopharyngia rutshuruensis De Wild.; Conopharyngia usambarensis (K.Schum ex Engl.) Stapf; Conopharyngia ventricosa (Hochst. ex A.DC.) Stapf; Domkeocarpa pendula Markgr.; Sarcopharyngia ventricosa (Hochst. ex A.DC.) Boiteau; Tabernaemontana usambarensis K.Schum ex Engl.

= Tabernaemontana ventricosa =

Species of plant

Tabernaemontana ventricosa, commonly known as forest toad-tree or small-fruited toad-tree, is a tree in the dogbane family Apocynaceae. It is native to Africa.

== Description ==
Tabernaemontana ventricosa grows as a smallish tree. It produces latex. The leathery leaves, clustered near branch ends, are oblong. The flowers are white. The fruit is oval-shaped.

== Taxonomy ==
Tabernaemontana ventricosa was initially described by German botanist Christian Hochstetter in 1844, subsequently validly published by Alphonse Pyramus de Candolle. The specific epithet ventricosa means 'ventricose' (swollen on one side).

== Distribution and habitat ==
Tabernaemontana ventricosa is native to an area of Africa from Nigeria east to Kenya and south to Mozambique. Its habitat is forests from sea level to 1,850 m (6,000 ft) altitude.

== Conservation ==
Tabernaemontana ventricosa has been assessed as least concern on the IUCN Red List. The species is broadly distributed and not considered to be facing any major threats.

== Uses ==
Tabernaemontana ventricosa is locally used in the treatment of wounds, fever and hypertension. The fruit is edible. The wood is locally used in planks.
