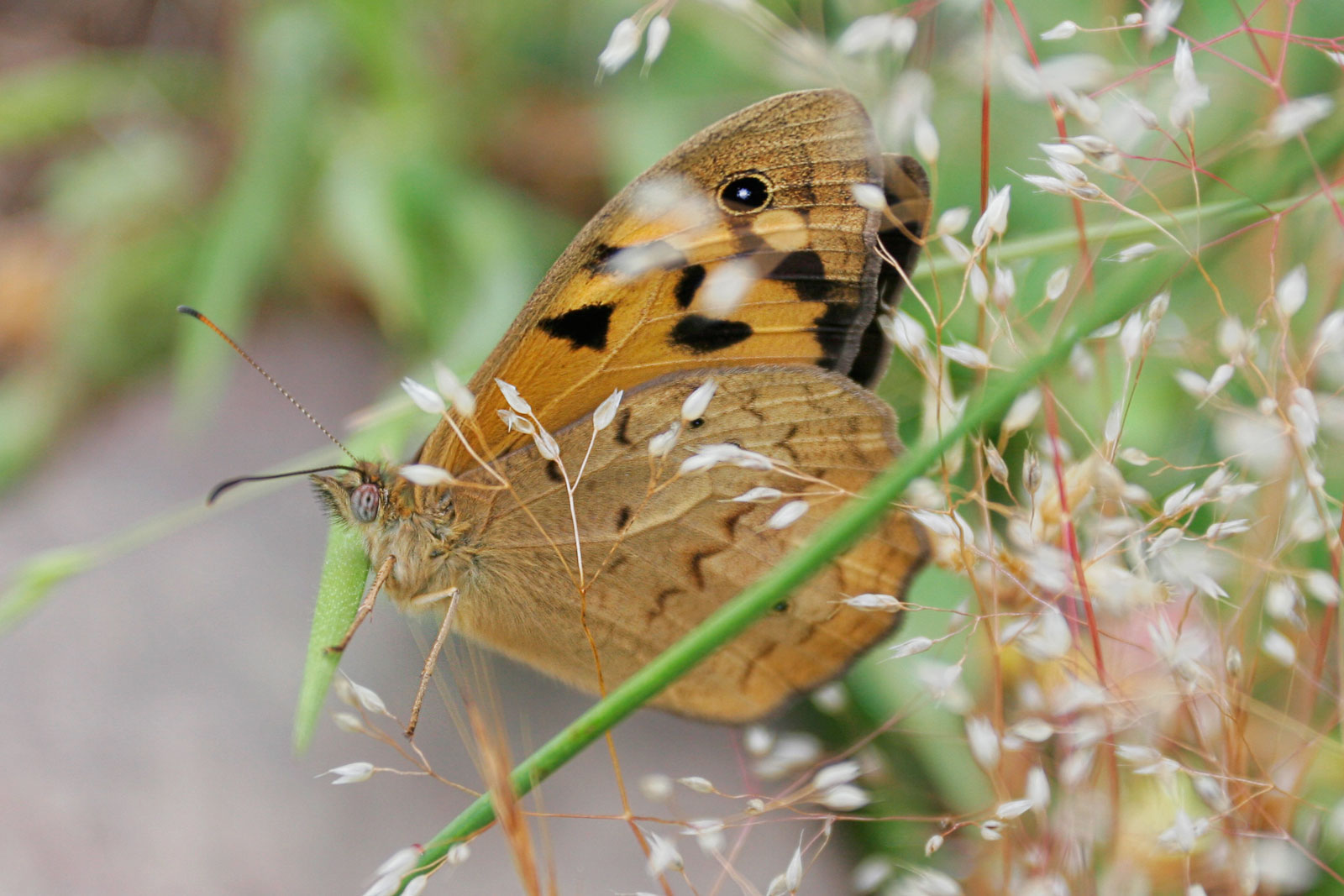
- Geitoneura klugii

Scientific classification
- Domain: Eukaryota
- Kingdom: Animalia
- Phylum: Arthropoda
- Class: Insecta
- Order: Lepidoptera
- Family: Nymphalidae
- Tribe: Satyrini
- Subtribe: Hypocystina; Miller, 1968

= Hypocystina =

Subtribe of butterflies

Hypocystina is a subtribe of butterflies.

- Argynnina Butler, 1867
- Argyronympha Mathew, 1886
- Argyrophenga Doubleday, 1845
- Dodonidia Butler, 1884
- Erebiola Fereday, 1878
- Erycinidia Rothschild & Jordan, 1905 - includes Pieridopsis
- Geitoneura Butler, 1867
- Harsiesis Fruhstorfer, 1911
- Heteronympha Wallengren, 1858 - includes Hipparchioides
- Hyalodia Jordan, 1924
- Hypocysta Westwood, 1851
- Lamprolenis Godman & Salvin, 1881
- Nesoxenica Waterhouse & Lyell, 1914
- Oreixenica Waterhouse & Lyell, 1914
- Paratisiphone Watkins, 1928
- Percnodaimon Butler, 1876
- Platypthima Rothschild & Jordan, 1905 - includes Altiapa
- Tisiphone Hübner, 1819 - includes Xenica
- Zipaetis Hewitson, 1863
