= Sword grass =

Sword grass may refer to:

- Some species of grasses with blades that are sharp enough to cut human skin (this is because they contain many silica phytoliths, a hardening material in many plants. The sharp blades help to discourage herbivores from grazing (also protecting the grasses around it)), including:
  - Gahnia species
  - Imperata cylindrica (cogon grass)
  - Poa ensiformis
- Moths and butterflies:
  - Xylena exsoleta (sword-grass)
  - Xylena vetusta (red sword-grass)
  - Tisiphone abeona (sword-grass brown)
  - Tisiphone helena (northern sword-grass brown)
