= Scylax (disambiguation) =

Scylax may refer to:

- Scylax of Caryanda, a Greek explorer and writer of the late 6th and early 5th centuries BCE
- Çekerek River, ancient Scylax, a tributary of the Yeşil River in Turkey
- Ps.-Scylax or Pseudo-Scylax, author of the Periplus of Pseudo-Scylax
- Zipaetis scylax, the dark catseye, a species of butterfly
- Scylax, a ship's captain from Myndus, noted by Herodotus
