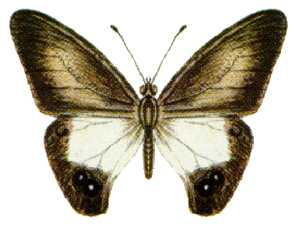

Scientific classification
- Domain: Eukaryota
- Kingdom: Animalia
- Phylum: Arthropoda
- Class: Insecta
- Order: Lepidoptera
- Family: Nymphalidae
- Genus: Hypocysta
- Species: H. angustata

Binomial name
- Hypocysta angustata Waterhouse & Lyell, 1914

= Hypocysta angustata =

Species of butterfly

Hypocysta angustata, the black and white ringlet or pied ringlet, is a species of butterfly of the family Nymphalidae. It is found on the Cape York Peninsula in Australia and in the rainforests of New Guinea.

The wingspan is about 30 mm (1.2 in).
