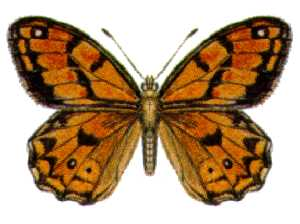

Scientific classification
- Domain: Eukaryota
- Kingdom: Animalia
- Phylum: Arthropoda
- Class: Insecta
- Order: Lepidoptera
- Family: Nymphalidae
- Genus: Geitoneura
- Species: G. minyas

Binomial name
- Geitoneura minyas (Waterhouse & Lyell, 1914)

Subspecies
- Geitoneura minyas minyas; Geitoneura minyas mjobergi

Synonyms
- Xenica minyas Waterhouse & Lyell, 1914; Xenica mjobergi Aurivillius, 1920

= Geitoneura minyas =

Species of butterfly

Geitoneura minyas, the western xenica, is a species of butterfly from the family Nymphalidae, found in the south-west of the Australian state of Western Australia.

== Description ==
The adults have orange wings with brown veins and markings. They have an eyespot on each forewing, and a vestigial eyespot on each hindwing. Their wingspan is approximately 3.5 cm.

The caterpillar is green and has a round head. It feeds on various types of grasses such as veldt grass.
