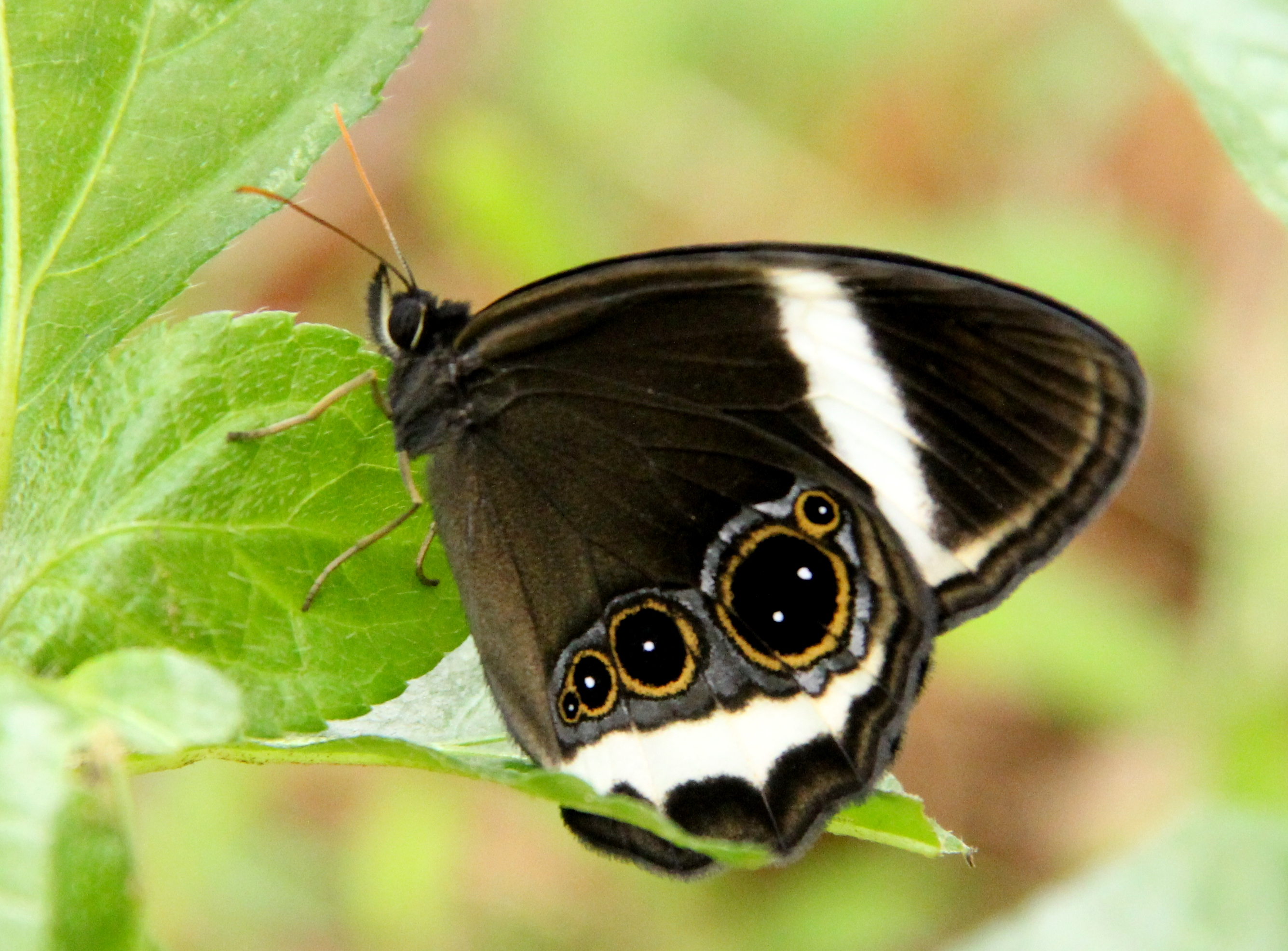

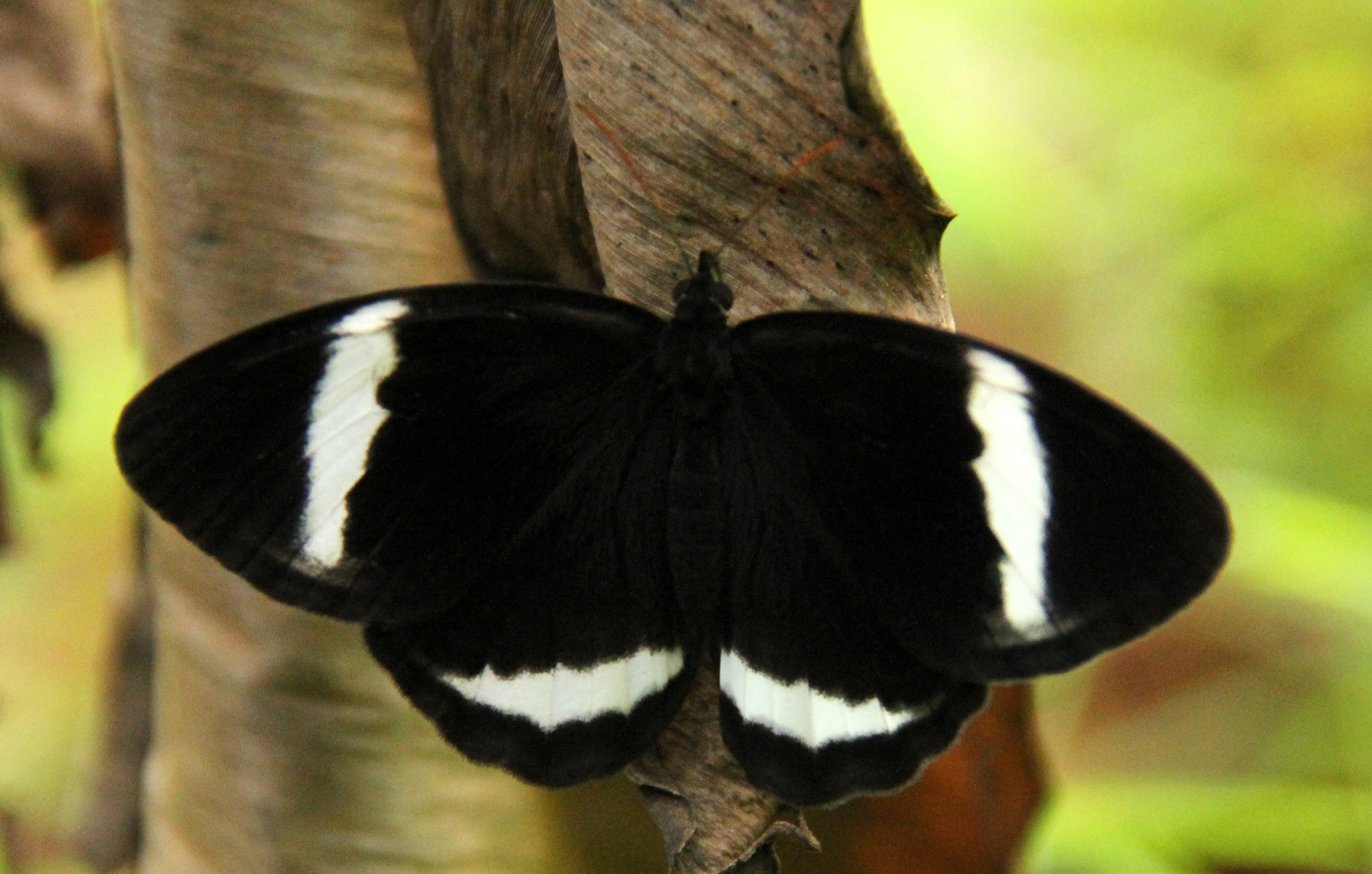

Scientific classification
- Kingdom: Animalia
- Phylum: Arthropoda
- Clade: Pancrustacea
- Class: Insecta
- Order: Lepidoptera
- Family: Nymphalidae
- Genus: Zipaetis
- Species: Z. saitis

Binomial name
- Zipaetis saitis Hewitson, 1863

= Zipaetis saitis =

Tamil catseye

Species of butterfly

Zipaetis saitis, the Tamil catseye, is a species of nymphalid butterfly found in South India.

== Description ==
The upperside in fresh specimens velvet black, or brown to light brown in the female. Forewing with a broad, oblique, snow-white band from middle of costa to near apex of interspace 1, inwardly emarginate in its lower third. Hindwing with a similar broad white postdiscal band parallel to the posterior two-thirds of the terminal margin, the outer margin of the band emarginate between the veins. Underside similar, ground colour paler; the white bands as on the upperside; both forewings and hindwings with a subterminal sinuous pale line. Hindwing with a row of five ocelli enclosed in a common silvery narrow band, on the inner side of the white band; each ocellus with a white centre, an inner ring of ochraceous, and an outer ring of blackish brown; the ocelli at the each end of the row the smallest, the preapical very large and bi-pupilled. Antennae ochraceous red; head, thorax and abdomen dark brown.

Expanse: 64–74 mm. (2.55-2.9 inches).

Habitat: Southern India; the Nilgiris, Anaimalai Hills, Kochi and Travancore.
