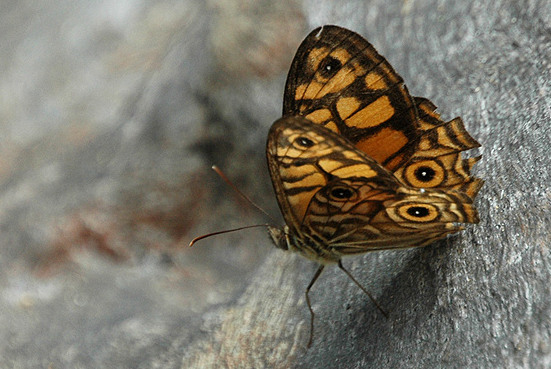
- Geitoneura acantha

Scientific classification
- Domain: Eukaryota
- Kingdom: Animalia
- Phylum: Arthropoda
- Class: Insecta
- Order: Lepidoptera
- Family: Nymphalidae
- Subtribe: Hypocystina
- Genus: Geitoneura; Butler, 1867

Species
- See text

= Geitoneura =

Xenica

Genus of butterflies

Geitoneura is a genus of nymphalid butterflies, commonly known as xenicas. The genus contains three species.

== Species ==
- Geitoneura acantha (Donovan, 1805) – eastern ringed xenica
- Geitoneura klugii (Guérin-Méneville, [1831]) – common xenica or Klug's xenica
- Geitoneura minyas (Waterhouse & Lyell, 1914) – western xenica
