= Hyalodia =

Scientific classification
- Kingdom: Animalia
- Phylum: Arthropoda
- Class: Insecta
- Order: Lepidoptera
- Family: Nymphalidae
- Subtribe: Hypocystina
- Genus: Hyalodia; Jordan, 1924
- Species: H. tenuisquamosa

Binomial name
- Hyalodia tenuisquamosa (Joicey & Talbot, 1922)

Genus of butterflies

Hyalodia is a monotypic butterfly genus of the subfamily Satyrinae in the family Nymphalidae. Its one species is Hyalodia tenuisquamosa.
