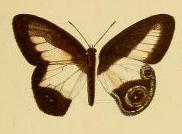

Scientific classification
- Domain: Eukaryota
- Kingdom: Animalia
- Phylum: Arthropoda
- Class: Insecta
- Order: Lepidoptera
- Family: Nymphalidae
- Genus: Hypocysta
- Species: H. aroa

Binomial name
- Hypocysta aroa Bethune-Baker, 1908

= Hypocysta aroa =

Species of butterfly

Hypocysta aroa is a species of butterfly of the family Nymphalidae. It is found in New Guinea.

== Subspecies ==
- Hypocysta aroa aroa (Papua New Guinea: Aroa River)
- Hypocysta aroa aspis Jordan, 1924 (northern New Guinea: Arfak Mountains)
