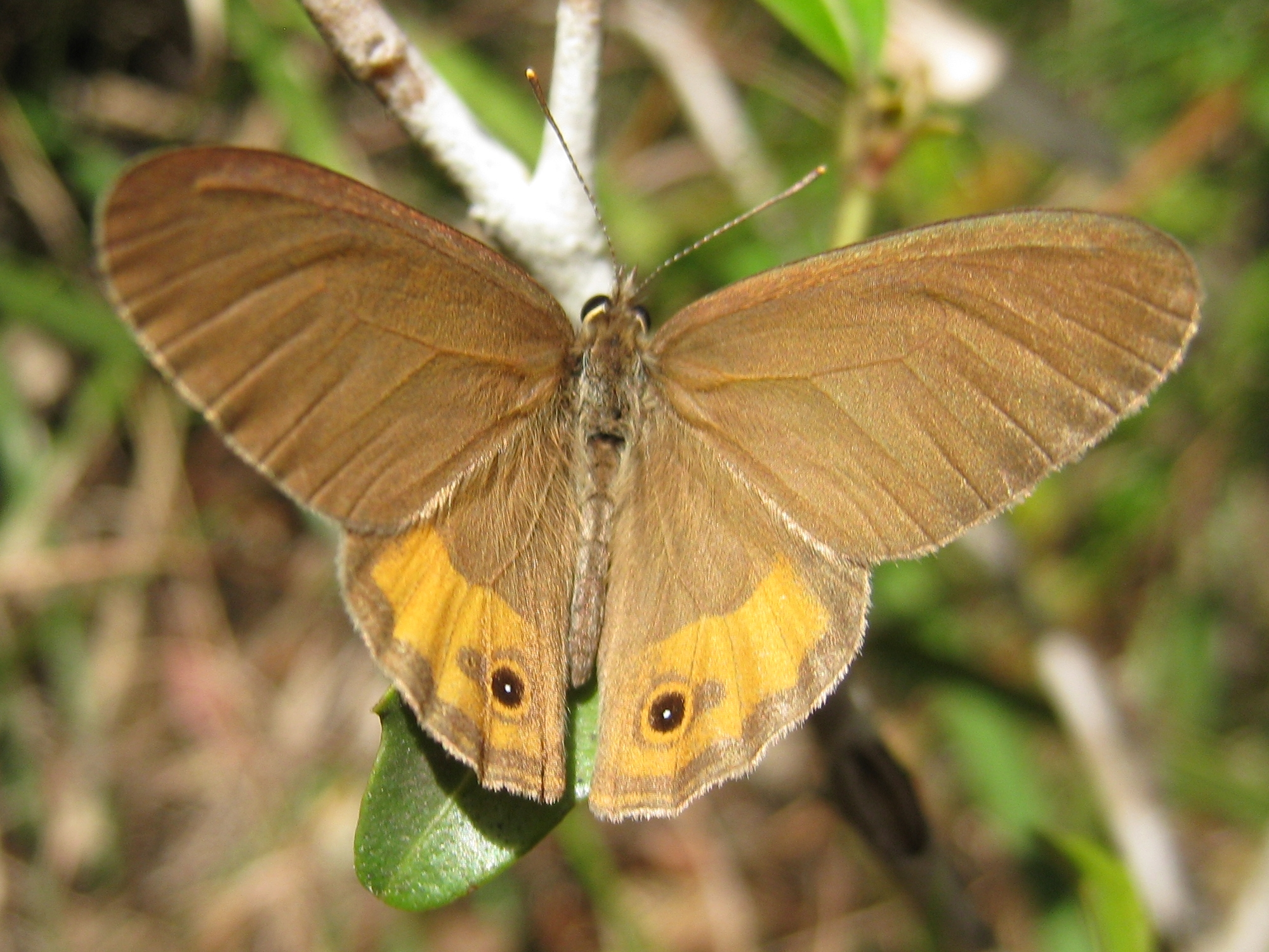

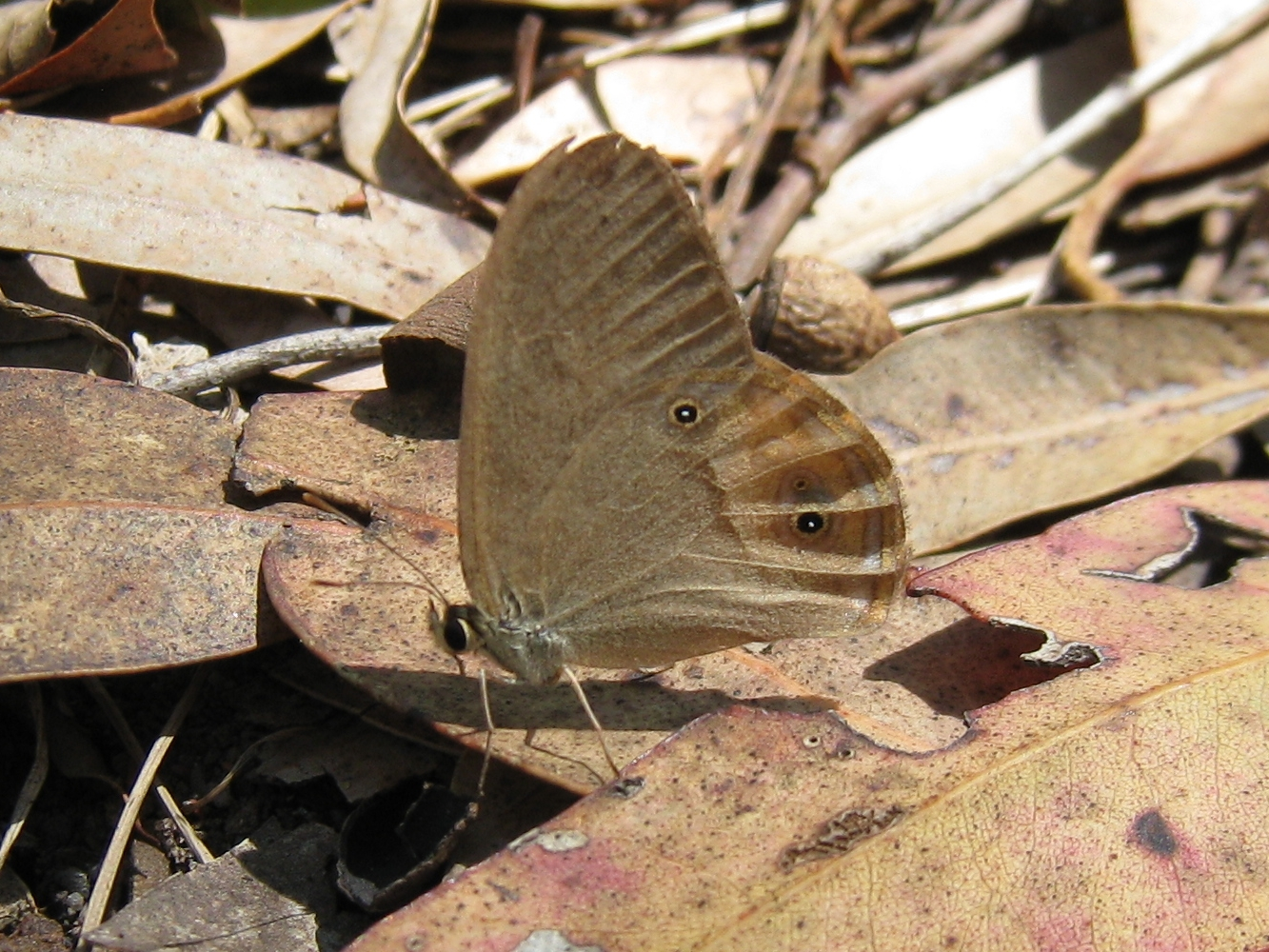

Scientific classification
- Domain: Eukaryota
- Kingdom: Animalia
- Phylum: Arthropoda
- Class: Insecta
- Order: Lepidoptera
- Family: Nymphalidae
- Genus: Hypocysta
- Species: H. pseudirius

Binomial name
- Hypocysta pseudirius Butler, 1875

Synonyms
- Hypocysta epirius Butler, 1875

= Hypocysta pseudirius =

Species of butterfly

Hypocysta pseudirius, the dingy ringlet or grey ringlet, is a species of butterfly of the family Nymphalidae. It is found in Australia, including Queensland and New South Wales. The wingspan is about 30 mm.

The larvae feed on various Poaceae species. Full-grown larvae are about 20 mm long.
