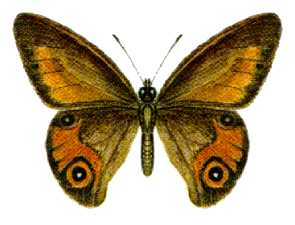

Scientific classification
- Domain: Eukaryota
- Kingdom: Animalia
- Phylum: Arthropoda
- Class: Insecta
- Order: Lepidoptera
- Family: Nymphalidae
- Genus: Hypocysta
- Species: H. irius

Binomial name
- Hypocysta irius (Fabricius, 1775)

Synonyms
- Papilio irius Fabricius, 1775

= Hypocysta irius =

Species of butterfly

Hypocysta irius, the northern ringlet or orange-streaked ringlet, is a species of butterfly of the family Nymphalidae. It is found in Australia, including Queensland and New South Wales.

The wingspan is about 30 mm.
