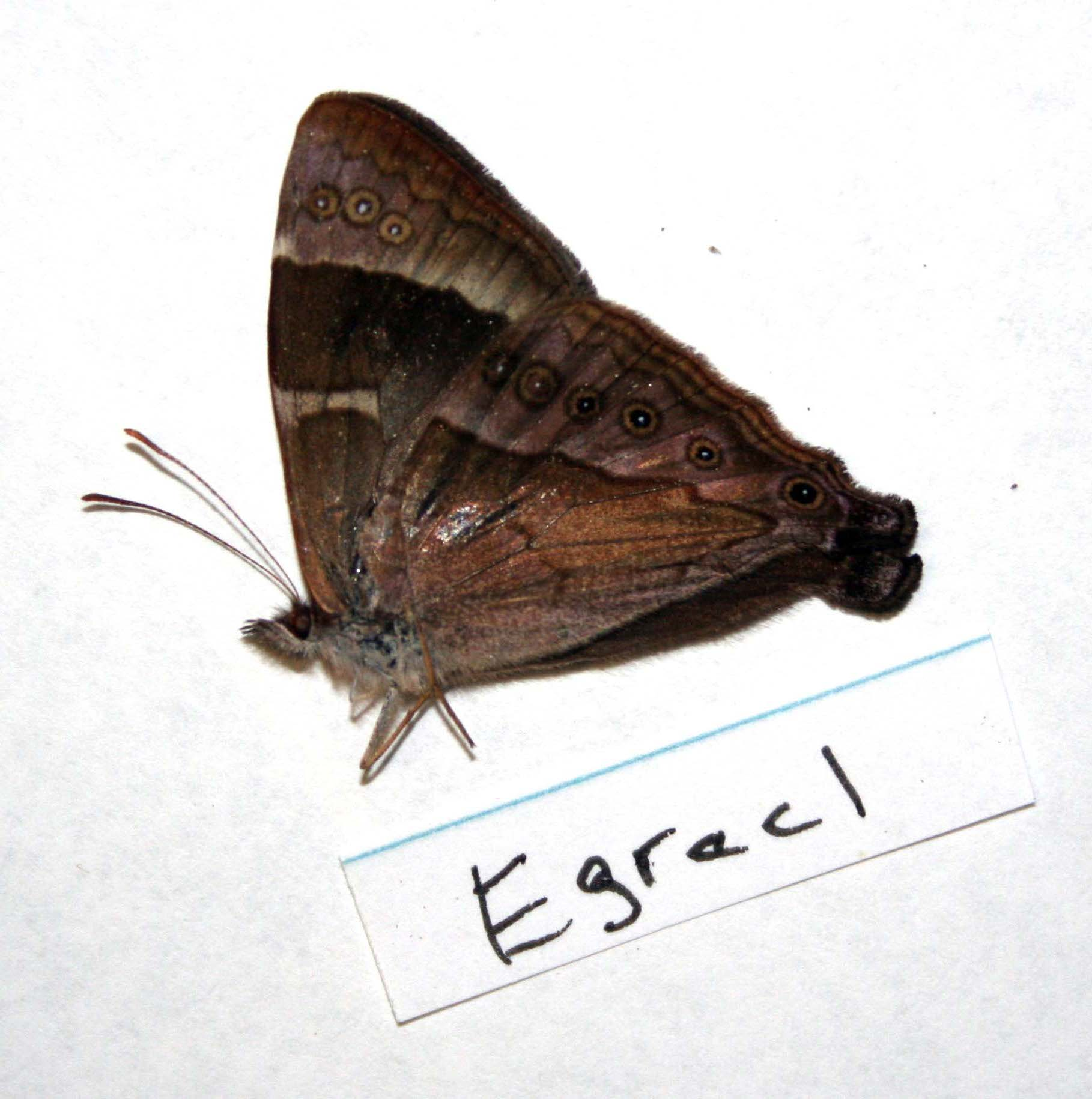
- Erycinidia gracilis

Scientific classification
- Kingdom: Animalia
- Phylum: Arthropoda
- Class: Insecta
- Order: Lepidoptera
- Family: Nymphalidae
- Subtribe: Hypocystina
- Genus: Erycinidia; Rothschild & Jordan, 1905

Synonyms
- Pieridopsis Rothschild & Jordan, 1905

= Erycinidia =

Genus of butterflies

Erycinidia is a genus of satyrid butterflies.

== Species ==
Listed alphabetically:

- Erycinidia ducis (Jordan, 1930)
- Erycinidia gracilis Rothschild & Jordan, 1905
- Erycinidia hemileuca Jordan, 1930
- Erycinidia maudei Joicey & Talbot, 1916
- Erycinidia tenera Jordan, 1930
- Erycinidia virgo (Rothschild & Jordan, 1905)
