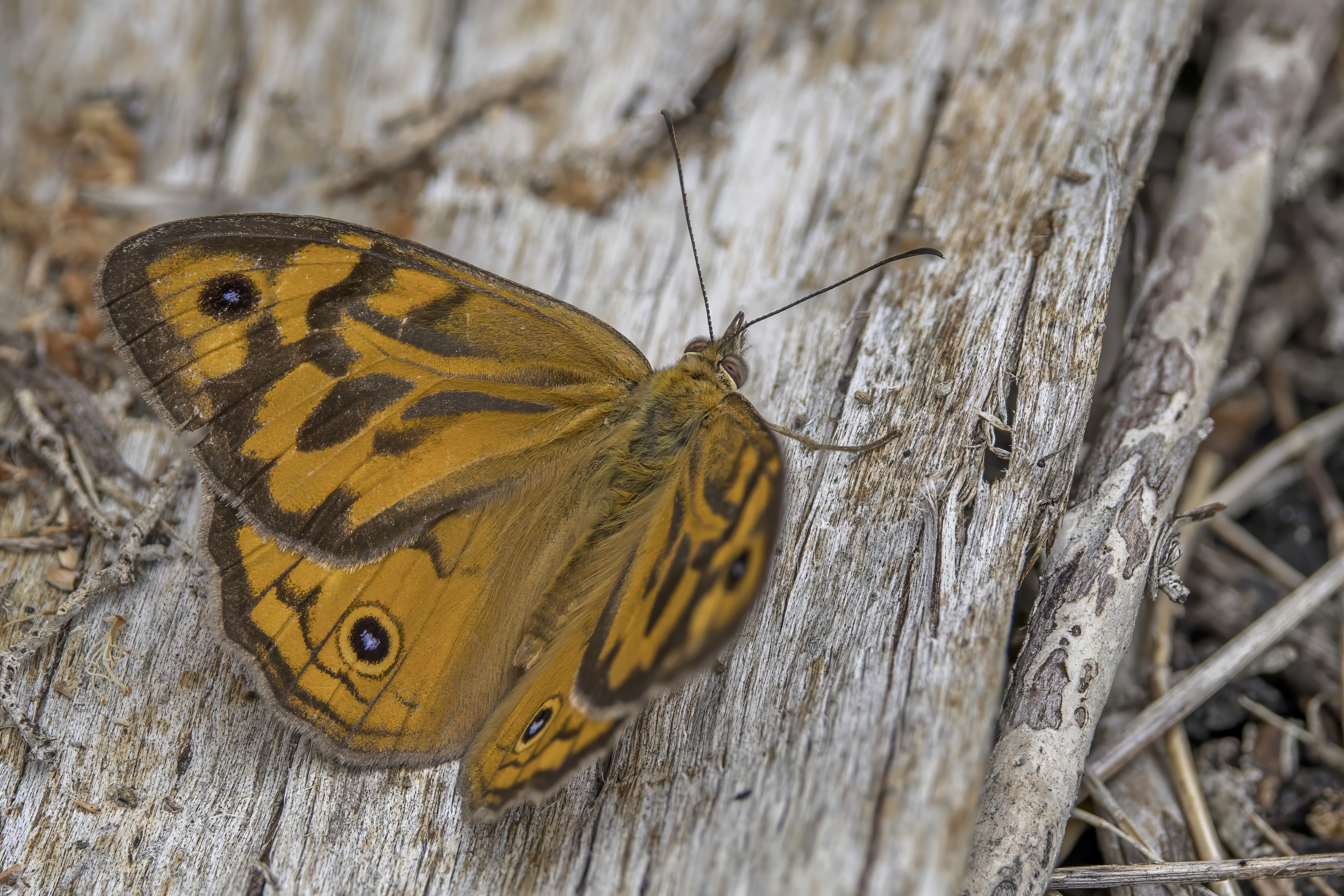

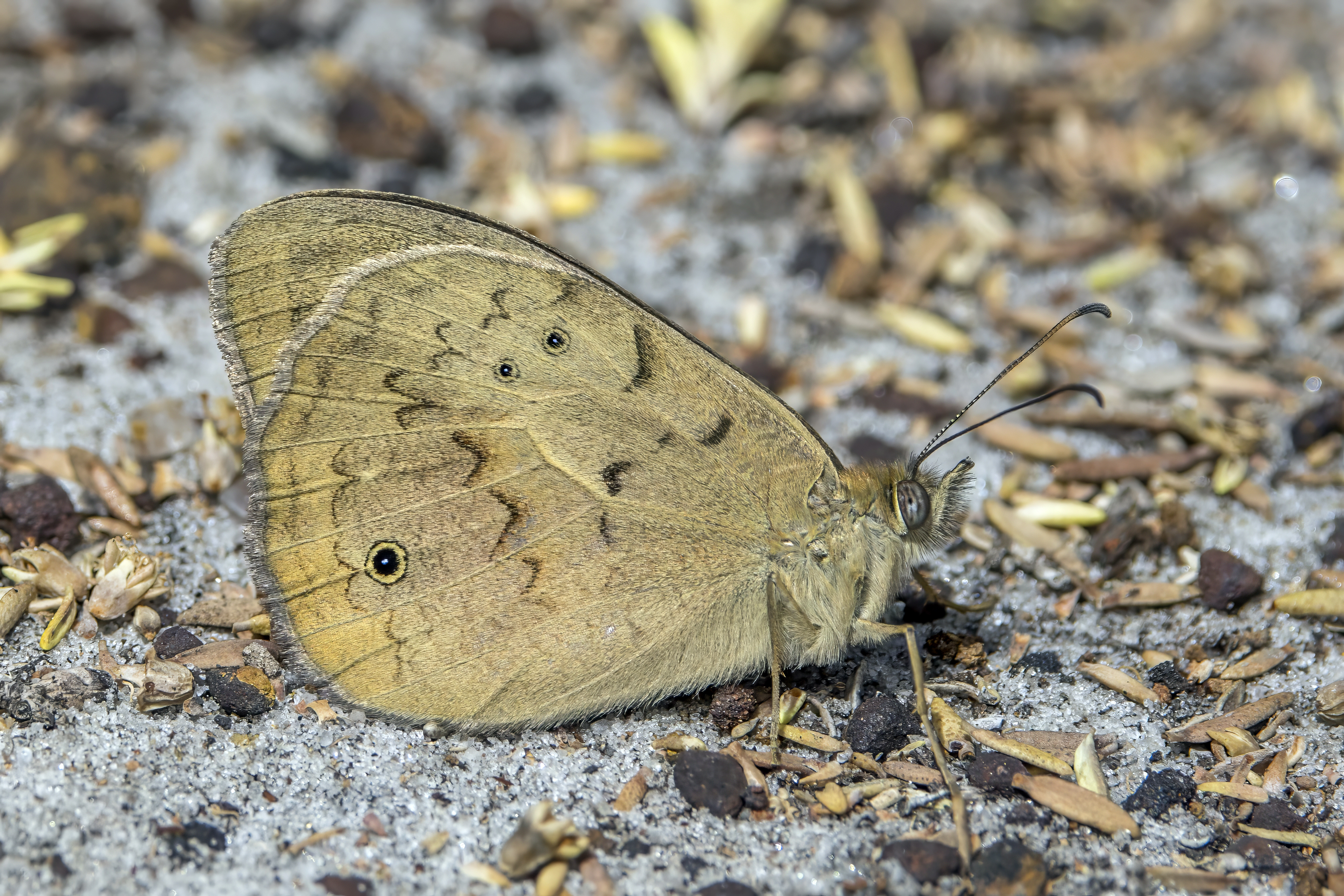
- Two males on Kangaroo Island, South Australia

Scientific classification
- Kingdom: Animalia
- Phylum: Arthropoda
- Clade: Pancrustacea
- Class: Insecta
- Order: Lepidoptera
- Family: Nymphalidae
- Genus: Heteronympha
- Species: H. merope

Binomial name
- Heteronympha merope Fabricius, 1775

Synonyms
- Satyrus archemor

= Heteronympha merope =

Species of butterfly

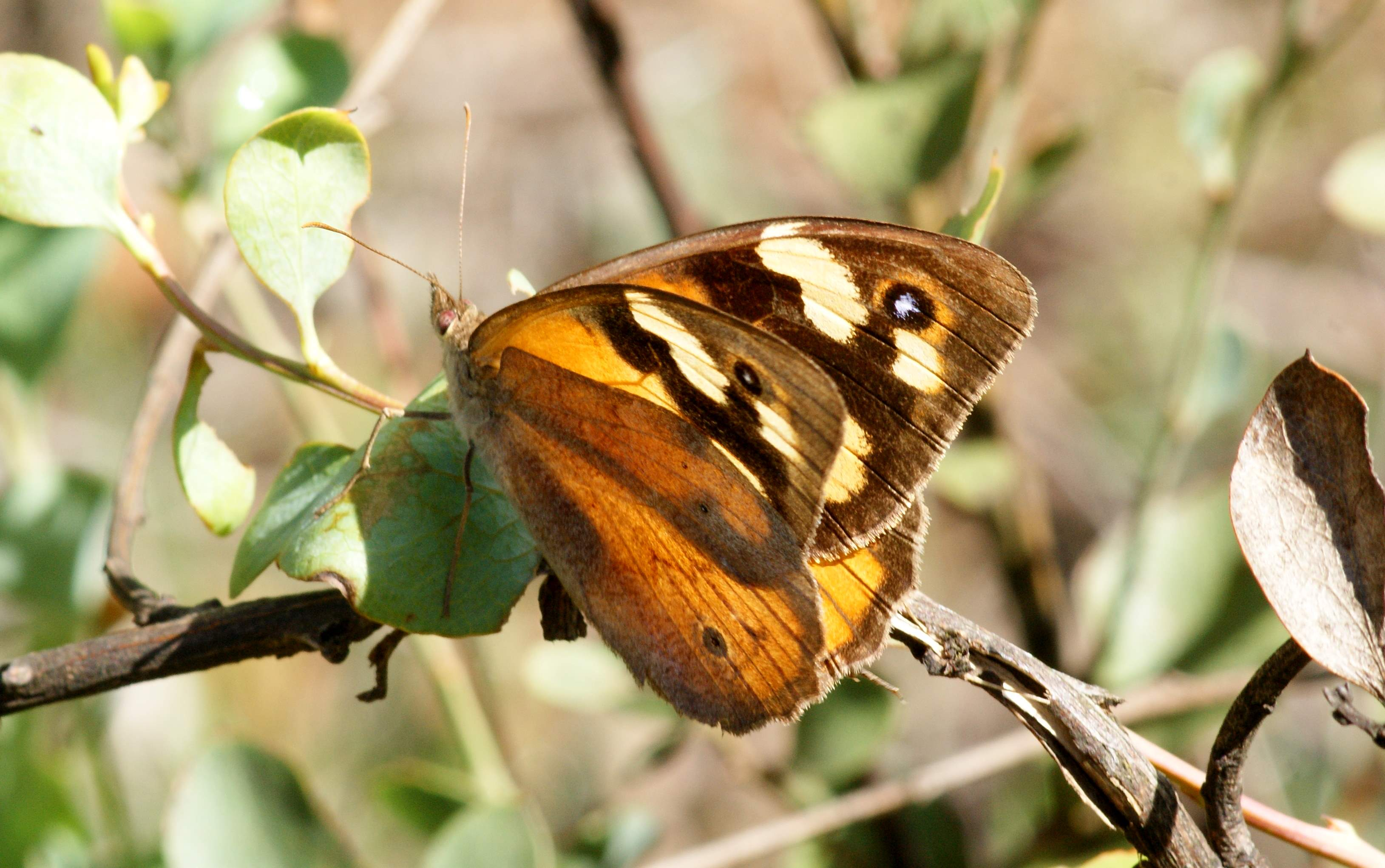
Female

Heteronympha merope, the common brown, is a species of butterfly of the family Nymphalidae, endemic to the southern half of Australia. The wingspan is about 60 millimetres (2.4 in) for males and 70 mm (2.8 in) for females.

The larvae feed on Poaceae species, including Brachypodium distachyon, Cynodon dactylon, Ehrharta erecta, Poa poiformis, Microlaena stipoides, Poa tenera and Themeda triandra. The common brown butterfly is emerging ten days earlier than it did 65 years ago due to the effects of climate change.

== General references ==
- Schlossmann, Jessie (23 March 2010). "Climate Change Causing Butterflies to Emerge Ten days Early". Australian Geographic. Archived from the original on 29 March 2010.
- "South Australian Butterflies Data Sheet".
