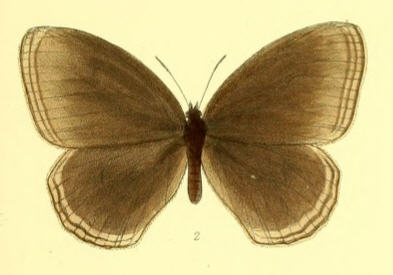

Scientific classification
- Domain: Eukaryota
- Kingdom: Animalia
- Phylum: Arthropoda
- Class: Insecta
- Order: Lepidoptera
- Family: Nymphalidae
- Tribe: Satyrini
- Subtribe: Hypocystina
- Genus: Zipaetis; Hewitson, 1863

Synonyms
- Zipoetes Wood-Mason, 1881

= Zipaetis =

Genus of butterflies

Zipaetis is a genus of satyrid butterflies found in southern Asia.

== Species ==
Listed alphabetically:

- Zipaetis saitis Hewitson, 1863 – Tamil catseye
- Zipaetis scylax Hewitson, 1863 – dark catseye
- Zipaetis unipupillata Lee, 1962
