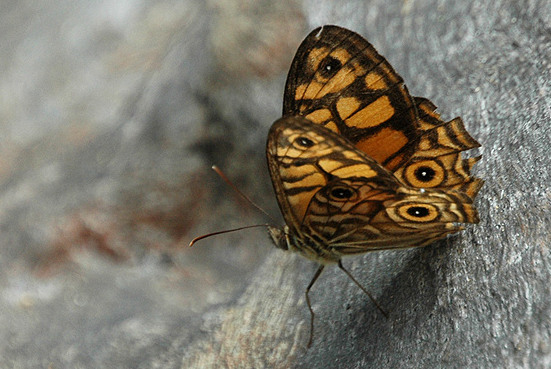

Scientific classification
- Domain: Eukaryota
- Kingdom: Animalia
- Phylum: Arthropoda
- Class: Insecta
- Order: Lepidoptera
- Family: Nymphalidae
- Genus: Geitoneura
- Species: G. acantha

Binomial name
- Geitoneura acantha (Donovan, 1805)

Synonyms
- Papilio acantha Donovan, 1805; Tisiphone acanthe Hübner, 1823; Lasiommata ocrea Guest, 1882

= Geitoneura acantha =

Species of butterfly

Geitoneura acantha, the ringed xenica or eastern ringed xenica, is a species of butterfly belonging to the family Nymphalidae. The species was first described by Edward Donovan as Papilio acantha in 1805. It occurs in the south-eastern mainland of Australia.
