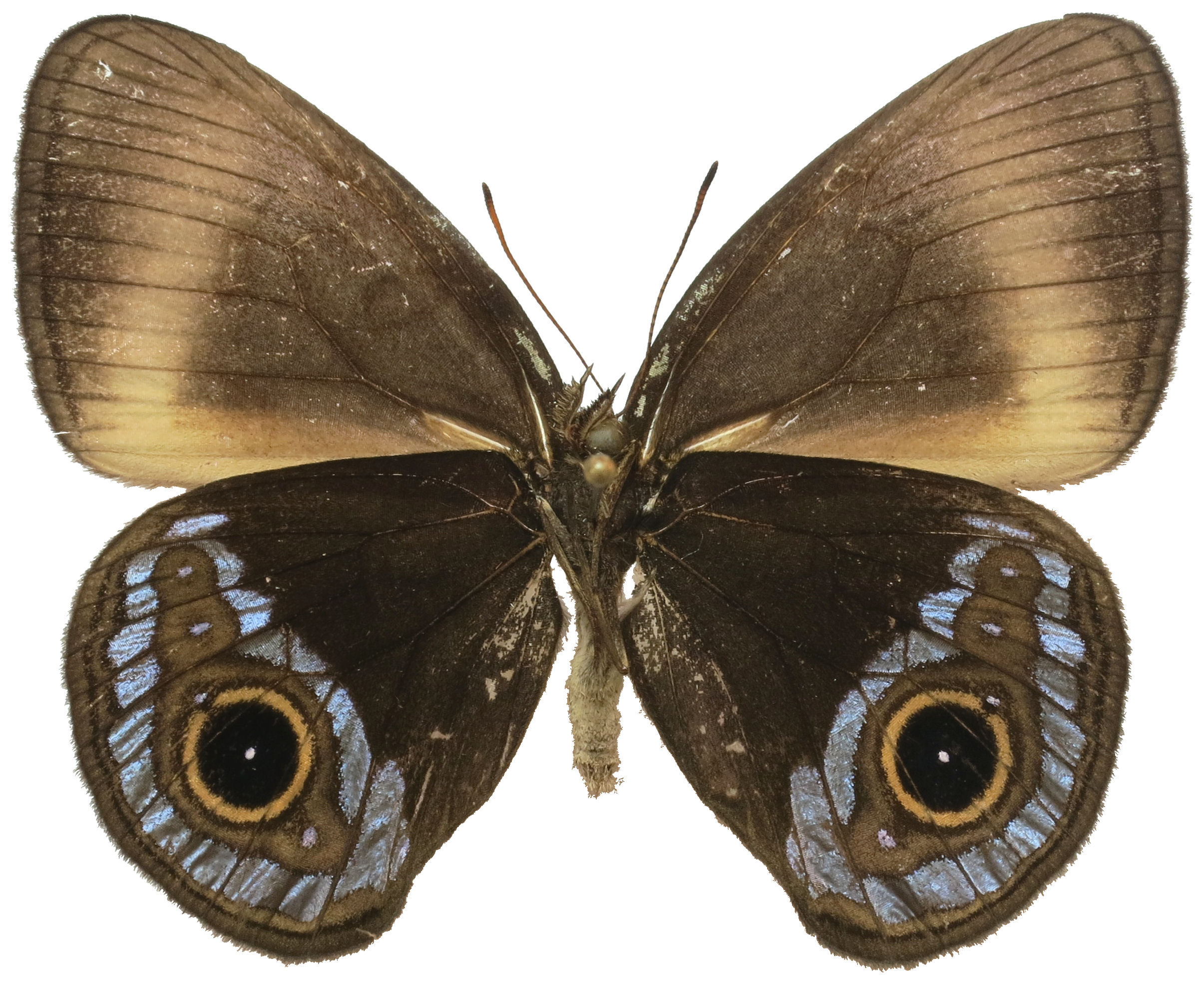
- Harsiesis hygea female underside - Timika, Central Papua

Scientific classification
- Domain: Eukaryota
- Kingdom: Animalia
- Phylum: Arthropoda
- Class: Insecta
- Order: Lepidoptera
- Family: Nymphalidae
- Subtribe: Hypocystina
- Genus: Harsiesis; Fruhstorfer, 1911

= Harsiesis (butterfly) =

Genus of butterflies

Harsiesis is a butterfly genus from the subfamily Satyrinae in the family Nymphalidae. The genus was erected by Hans Fruhstorfer in 1911. The species are found in Indonesia.

== Species ==
Listed alphabetically:

- Harsiesis hygea (Hewitson, [1863])
- Harsiesis hecaerge (Hewitson, 1863)
- Harsiesis yolanthe Fruhstorfer, 1913
