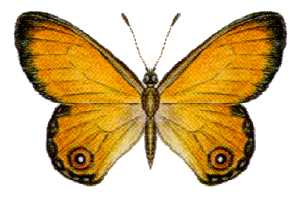

Scientific classification
- Kingdom: Animalia
- Phylum: Arthropoda
- Class: Insecta
- Order: Lepidoptera
- Family: Nymphalidae
- Genus: Hypocysta
- Species: H. adiante

Binomial name
- Hypocysta adiante (Hübner, 1825)

Synonyms
- Neonympha adiante Hübner, 1825; Hypocysta undulata Butler, 1875; Hypocysta linea Miskin, 1891; Hypocysta antirius Butler, 1868

= Hypocysta adiante =

Species of butterfly

Hypocysta adiante, the orange ringlet, is a species of butterfly of the family Nymphalidae. It is found in Australia, including Queensland, New South Wales, the Northern Territory and the north of Western Australia.

== Subspecies ==
- Hypocysta adiante adiante (Torres Strait Islands, Cape York to Sydney)
- Hypocysta adiante antirius Butler, 1868 (Darwin region)

== Habitat ==
Hypocysta adiante are found in open grassy areas in woodland and open forest and can also be found in suburban areas.

=== Host Plants ===
The larvae of Hypocysta adiante feed on plants of the family Poaceae including Themeda triandra.
