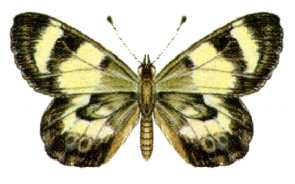

Scientific classification
- Kingdom: Animalia
- Phylum: Arthropoda
- Class: Insecta
- Order: Lepidoptera
- Family: Nymphalidae
- Subfamily: Satyrinae
- Tribe: Satyrini
- Subtribe: Hypocystina
- Genus: Nesoxenica; Waterhouse & Lyell, 1914
- Species: N. leprea

Binomial name
- Nesoxenica leprea (Hewitson, 1864)

Synonyms
- Geitoneura lepera (Fruhstorfer, 1911); Lasiommata leprea Hewitson, 1864; Nesoxenica elia Waterhouse & Lyell, 1914

= Nesoxenica =

Species of butterfly endemic to Tasmania

Nesoxenica leprea, commonly known as the Tasmanian xenica, is a butterfly and the only species from the genus Nesoxenica in the brown family Nymphalidae, subfamily Satyrinae. This species is native to Australia and is the only butterfly genus to be endemic to Tasmania. Its restricted distribution to Tasmanian mountains has led to theories of it being a Gondwanan relict.

== Description ==
As adults, they are quite similar in appearance with both males and females reaching 32–42 mm (1.3–1.7 in) in wingspan. Their wings are relatively narrow with the rounded termen and a very hairy basal area. Upperside: black with either cream or pale-yellow markings, white chequered terminal scale-fringe, cream median band on the fore wing with subapical band being narrower, cream median band on hind wing and two obscure black postmedian dots. Worn specimens tend to have white markings and pale yellow in newly emerged specimens, changing to cream after a few hours. Underside: fore wing is similar to the upperside except has pale yellow markings, with either one or two black obscure subapical dots and numerous white subterminal dots, black ground colour on hind wing with markings of silvery-white, and a sequence of six black postmedian spots ringed with white with the closest tornus being formed by two spots fusing together. The antenna of the fore wing is roughly half the length of the costa with the club being broad; their eyes are hairy; strongly swollen main veins at the base in the fore wing; the cell is roughly half the length of the hind wing; and the male lacks sex-scales.

== Distribution and habitat ==
It is found in cool-temperate rainforests dominated by Nothofagus cunninghamii (Tasmanian beech) where small fine leaf sedge grows as their larval food, Uncinia tenella (Cyperaceae), amongst dense mossy ground cover. In Athrotaxis cupressoides (pencil pine) dominated forests at high altitudinal areas, like lkae Tyre and Hartz Mountain where it frequently snows during winter, N. lepra tends to occur on alpine plateaux. They have also been seen in wet eucalyptus forests and Leptospermum swamps on occasion; however, these are not their breeding habitats. Adults are often seen in more open areas of the understory where the sunlight penetrates the canopy and there is a larger abundance of the foodplant. These areas include clearings, along margins of the rainforest, and along creeks. At times, these butterflies may fly into the alpine zone searching for the nectar of the flowers from the prostrate heath plant, Pentachondra pumila (Epacridaceae).

== Immature stages and life cycle ==
The eggs are 0.8–1 mm (0.031–0.039 in) wide, pale shiny green, subsherical, and fine ribs that are longitudinal. Females lay their eggs on Uncinia tenella (hook sedge) during mid-summer. At the pupa stage, the posterior end is attached to the foodplant to feed. The caterpillars of Nesoxenica have a green body with yellow lateral lines. They use tussocks of grass to snuggle into as a way of protecting themselves from the cold. The caterpillars nocturnally feed on Carex austrotenella (delicate hook sedge). As adults, they are most active during mid-day and rest on the foliage of N. cunninghamii where they are camouflaged against lichen. N. lepra have been observed feeding on flowers of Leptospermum langigerum (woolly tea-tree), Prostanthera lasianthos (Victorian Christmas-bush), Pentachondra pumila (carpet heath), and Ritchea scoparia (scoparia).

=== Flight period ===
Their flight period is between November and March, with most adults emerging in mid-December while numbers remain high until mid-January. They are less active during hot weather.

== Subspecies ==
N. l. lepra (Hewitson, 1864) and N. l. elia (Waterhouse & Lyell, 1914) are the only two recognized subspecies, with boundaries between each a transition zone exists where intermediate forms occur. N. l. lepra has varying markings on the upperside of the wings changing from cream to deep yellow, in contrast N. l. elia has deep yellow to orange markings on the upperside of both wings. N. l. lepra tend to occur in eastern and southern Tasmania, while N. l. elia is widespread in western and south-western Tasmania in colder areas with higher rainfall.
