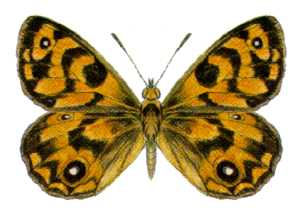

Scientific classification
- Domain: Eukaryota
- Kingdom: Animalia
- Phylum: Arthropoda
- Class: Insecta
- Order: Lepidoptera
- Family: Nymphalidae
- Genus: Heteronympha
- Species: H. cordace

Binomial name
- Heteronympha cordace (Geyer, 1832)

Synonyms
- Tisiphone cordace Geyer, 1832; Heteronympha wilsoni Burns, 1948

= Heteronympha cordace =

Species of butterfly

Heteronympha cordace, the bright-eyed brown, is a brown colored butterfly endemic to Australia. It was described by Carl Geyer in 1832.

== Description ==
Heteronympha cordace has a wingspan ranging from 38–42 mm (1.5–1.7 in), with females generally larger than males and with stouter abdomens. The uppersides of the wings are black to dark brown with orange to brownish-orange markings. The markings contain a blue-centered black subapical eyespot and a larger blue-centered black subtornal eyespot. The underside of the wings are lighter in hue and have more extensive orange areas.

== Range ==
The Heteronympha cordace butterfly occurs in disjunct populations across Australia, in New South Wales, southern Victoria, south eastern South Australia, and Tasmania. Populations of the butterfly are known from swampy areas in the alpine of the Great Divide to coastal areas in both the east and west. It is not common in any areas and colonies tend to be static, and many populations have become extinct as a result of habitat loss.

== Ecology ==
Adult butterflies have a slow, meandering flight pattern close to the ground among the larval host plants, and near food plants Melaleuca and Leptospermum that grow near the breeding habitat. One generation is completed annually, with adults occurring mainly from late December to February.

It is fond of sedgeland and low shrubland in swamps and along creeks, often with dense stands of the larval food plant. It occurs mostly at altitudes from 600–1,800 m (2,000–5,900 ft) but can occur as low as sea level in Tasmania.

The larval food plant of Heteronympha cordace is Carex appressa. The female butterfly lays a single egg or very few on the underside of the lower leaves of Carex appressa. The eggs are .8 mm (0.031 in) in diameter, green, nearly spherical, and have thin longitudinal ribs. The larva is green to greenish brown and generally 25 mm (0.98 in) long. The larva has a darker middorsal line with paler dorsolateral and lateral lines. The head of the larva is slightly concave and reddish brown to mottled brown. The pupa of the butterfly is green with greenish-yellow wings, and about 14 mm (0.55 in) long. Pupation occurs either on a low leaf of a host plant or nearby a host plant, and the pupa is suspended with its head downwards by the cremaster.

== Subspecies ==
- Heteronympha cordace cordace (southern New South Wales to Victoria: Mt. Buangor)
- Heteronympha cordace wilsoni Burns, 1948 (Victoria: Grampians)
- Heteronympha cordace comptena Couchman, 1954 (Tasmania: central and west coast)
- Heteronympha cordace kurena Couchman, 1954 (Tasmania: Cradle Mountains)
- Heteronympha cordace legana Couchman, 1954 (Tasmania: Lake Leake, Mount Barrow)
