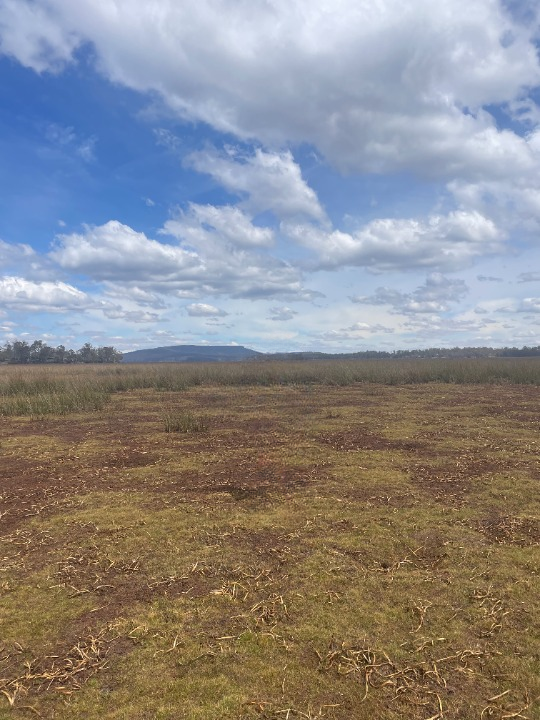
- Native Poa grassland habitat of the Ptunarra brown butterfly in Tasmania.

Conservation status
- Endangered (TSPA)

Scientific classification
- Kingdom: Animalia
- Phylum: Arthropoda
- Clade: Pancrustacea
- Class: Insecta
- Order: Lepidoptera
- Family: Nymphalidae
- Genus: Oreixenica
- Species: O. ptunarra

Binomial name
- Oreixenica ptunarra Couchman, 1953
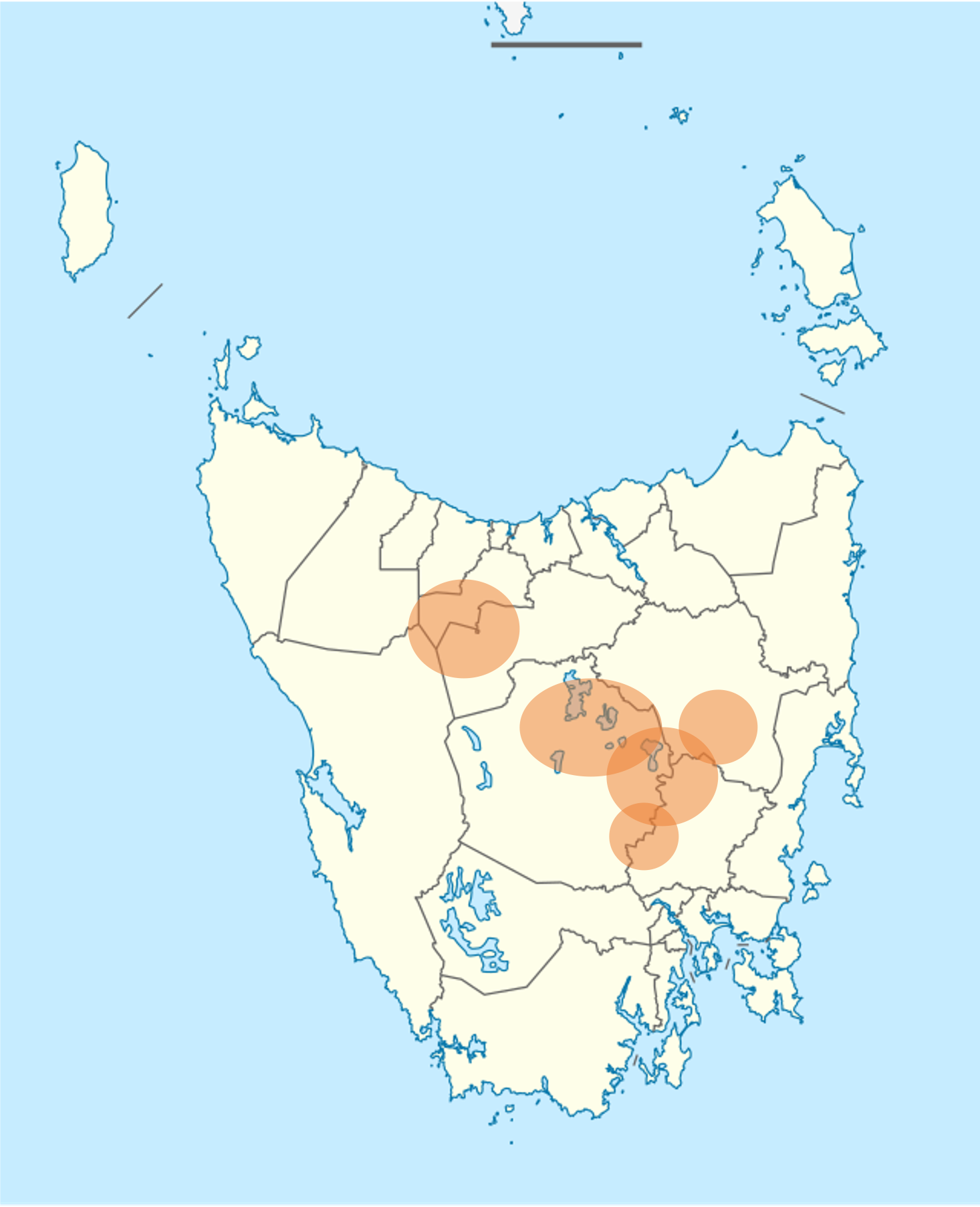
- Approximate distribution of the Ptunarra brown butterfly (Oreixenica ptunarra) across central and eastern Tasmania.

Synonyms
- Oreixenica angeli Couchman, 1953; Oreixenica roonina Couchman, 1953

= Oreixenica ptunarra =

Species of butterfly

Oreixenica ptunnara, the Ptunarra brown butterfly, is a species of butterfly in the family Nymphalidae that is endemic to Tasmania, Australia. The species occurs in native grassland and grassy woodland habitats across parts of central and eastern Tasmania. The butterfly has experienced significant habitat loss since European settlement and is listed as endangered under the Threatened Species Protection Act 1995.

== Taxonomy ==
The butterfly was first formally described in 1953 by Australian entomologist Leonard Edgar Couchman, who placed the species in the genus Oreixenica. The genus Oreixenica belongs to the butterfly family Nymphalidae, within the subfamily Satyrinae.

Three subspecies of O. ptunarra have been described based on variation in size, colouration and geographic distribution:

- Oreixenica ptunarra roonina, recorded from the Midlands, Northwest Plains and lower Steppes
- Oreixenica ptunarra angeli, recorded from the Eastern Highlands
- Oreixenica ptunarra ptunarra, recorded from the Central Plateau

All subpopulations are referred to and managed together as O. ptunarra.

== Description ==
The Ptunarra brown butterfly is a small brown and orange butterfly with a wingspan ranging from 25 to 33 mm, depending on the subspecies. Females are similar in size to males but differ in colouration. The upper surfaces of the wings of the female adult butterflies are light orange with light brown accents on the front margins of the fore and hind wings. The males are dark brown with cream-white markings and yellow patches. Both sexes have characteristic eyespots on both wings. The underside is the same as the upper side but paler and with an extra eye spot on each hindwing.

The fully developed caterpillar reaches approximately 19 mm in length and 4.5 mm in width. The body is greenish-grey and tapers toward the head and tail. A dark dorsal line runs along the body surrounded by narrow lighter lines. The head bears a small number of scattered black hairs.

The pupa measures 9.5 mm in length and 3.5 mm in width. It is greenish-grey with black flecking and a pair of black spots on each body segment.

== Distribution ==
The Ptunarra brown butterfly is endemic to Tasmania and occurs in five main regions of the state:

- the Midlands
- the Steppes
- the Northwest Plains
- the Eastern Highlands
- the Central Plateau

The species is typically found at elevations above 400 metres. It does not occur in the lower plains of the Midlands, where climatic conditions are considered too warm and dry for the butterfly and its food plants.

Throughout its range the species occurs in areas with a substantial cover of poa tussock grasses. Suitable habitats include:

- Poa tussock grassland
- grassy shrubland dominated by Hakea microcarpa
- grassy open woodland dominated by Eucalyptus species

== Lifecycle and ecology ==
O. ptunarra has a one year life cycle. The adult butterflies emerge in early March and the flying season lasts for two to three weeks. The females lay their eggs in flight, dropping them into tussock grass. After approximately six weeks, the larvae hatch. Larvae remain mostly inactive during winter and begin feeding on the tips of tussock grasses during the following spring. Pupation occurs within the base of the grass tussocks and may last up to five weeks. Adults emerge during autumn, with males typically emerging before females, and individuals at higher altitudes emerging earlier than those at lower elevations.

Adult ptunarra brown butterflies are generalist nectar feeders that visit most any flowers blooming in the grasslands.

The species is considered a weak flier and is unable to travel long distances through unsuitable habitat, which limits its ability to recolonise sites if local populations become extinct.

== Conservation status ==
The Ptunarra brown butterfly has been well surveyed over the last 3 decades and the majority of colonies of the butterfly are now believed to be known.

The species has experienced a substantial reduction in its range since European settlement in Tasmania. Historically, the species is thought to have been widespread in Poa grasslands, shrublands and open woodland habitats across central Tasmania.

Large areas of these habitats have been cleared or modified for agriculture and other land uses. In the Tasmanian Midlands, less than 3% of the original native grassland extent remains, while across the state approximately 40% of Poa grassland has been lost since 1802.

The species is listed as endangered on the Tasmanian Threatened Species Protection Act 1995.

== Threats and management ==
Habitat loss and fragmentation are some of the primary threats to the Ptunarra brown butterfly. Many native grasslands and grassy woodlands have been converted to pasture land or plantation forestry.

Grazing intensity can influence butterfly populations. Heavy grazing reduces suitable tussock habitat, while the absence of grazing may allow grasses to become overly dense and less suitable for the species.

Inappropriate fire regimes also affect habitat quality. Frequent burning can reduce butterfly populations, while the absence of fire can allow shrub species to invade grassland and reduce the cover of Poa tussocks.

Predation by introduced European wasps (Vespula germanica and V. vulgaris) is a significant threat to the Ptunarra brown butterfly, and a decline of 44% in individual numbers in the northwest plains over a period of 15 years was attributed to their introduction.

Because the species is a weak flyer, the loss of small local populations may be permanent if suitable habitat corridors are not present. Contemporary conservation management focuses on protecting existing colonies, maintaining suitable grassland habitat, and working with landowners to implement appropriate management practices.

Long-term monitoring programs have also been established by conservation organisations to support management of the species. At the Vale of Belvoir Reserve, the Tasmanian Land Conservancy has been conducting annual surveys of the Ptunarra brown butterfly since 2010 to track population trends and assess Poa grassland management practices.
