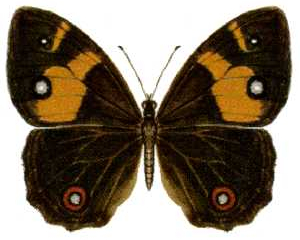
- Tisiphone abeona

Scientific classification
- Domain: Eukaryota
- Kingdom: Animalia
- Phylum: Arthropoda
- Class: Insecta
- Order: Lepidoptera
- Family: Nymphalidae
- Subtribe: Hypocystina
- Genus: Tisiphone; Hübner, [1819]

Synonyms
- Xenica Westwood, [1851]

= Tisiphone (butterfly) =

Genus of insects

Tisiphone is a genus of butterflies of the subfamily Satyrinae in the family Nymphalidae. The genus was erected by Jacob Hübner in 1819.

== Species ==
Listed alphabetically:

- Tisiphone abeona (Donovan, 1805) – sword grass brown
- Tisiphone helena (Olliff, 1888) – Helena brown
