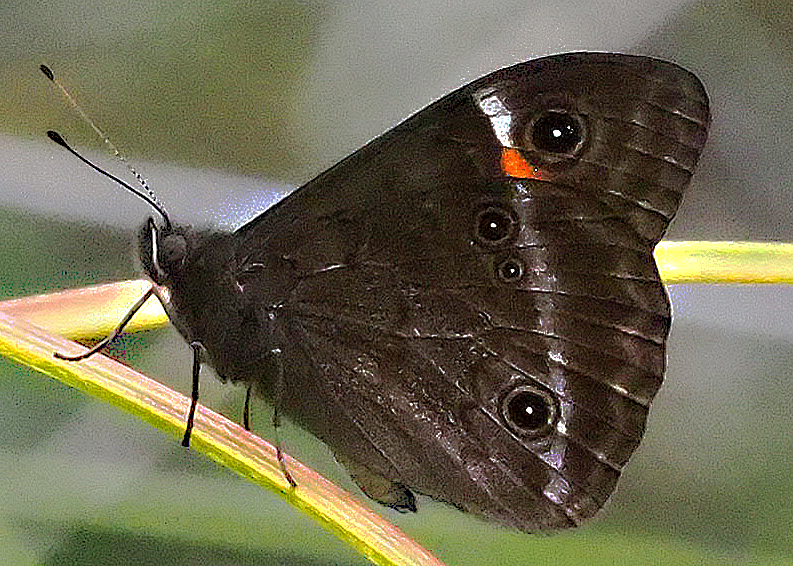

Scientific classification
- Kingdom: Animalia
- Phylum: Arthropoda
- Class: Insecta
- Order: Lepidoptera
- Family: Nymphalidae
- Subfamily: Satyrinae
- Tribe: Satyrini
- Subtribe: Hypocystina
- Genus: Paratisiphone; Watkins, 1928
- Species: P. lyrnessa

Binomial name
- Paratisiphone lyrnessa (Hewitson, 1872)

= Paratisiphone =

Genus of butterflies

Paratisiphone is a monotypic butterfly genus of the subfamily Satyrinae in the family Nymphalidae. Its one species is Paratisiphone lyrnessa.
