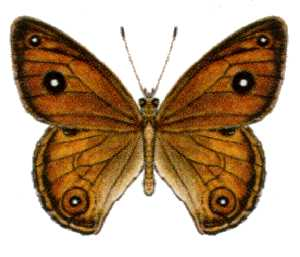

Scientific classification
- Domain: Eukaryota
- Kingdom: Animalia
- Phylum: Arthropoda
- Class: Insecta
- Order: Lepidoptera
- Family: Nymphalidae
- Genus: Hypocysta
- Species: H. euphemia

Binomial name
- Hypocysta euphemia Westwood, [1851]

= Hypocysta euphemia =

Species of butterfly

Hypocysta euphemia, the rock ringlet, is a species of butterfly of the family Nymphalidae. It is found in Australia, including southern Queensland, New South Wales and Victoria.

The wingspan is about 40 mm.
