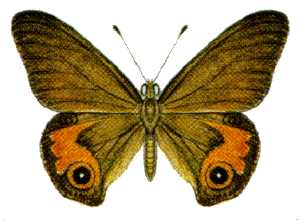

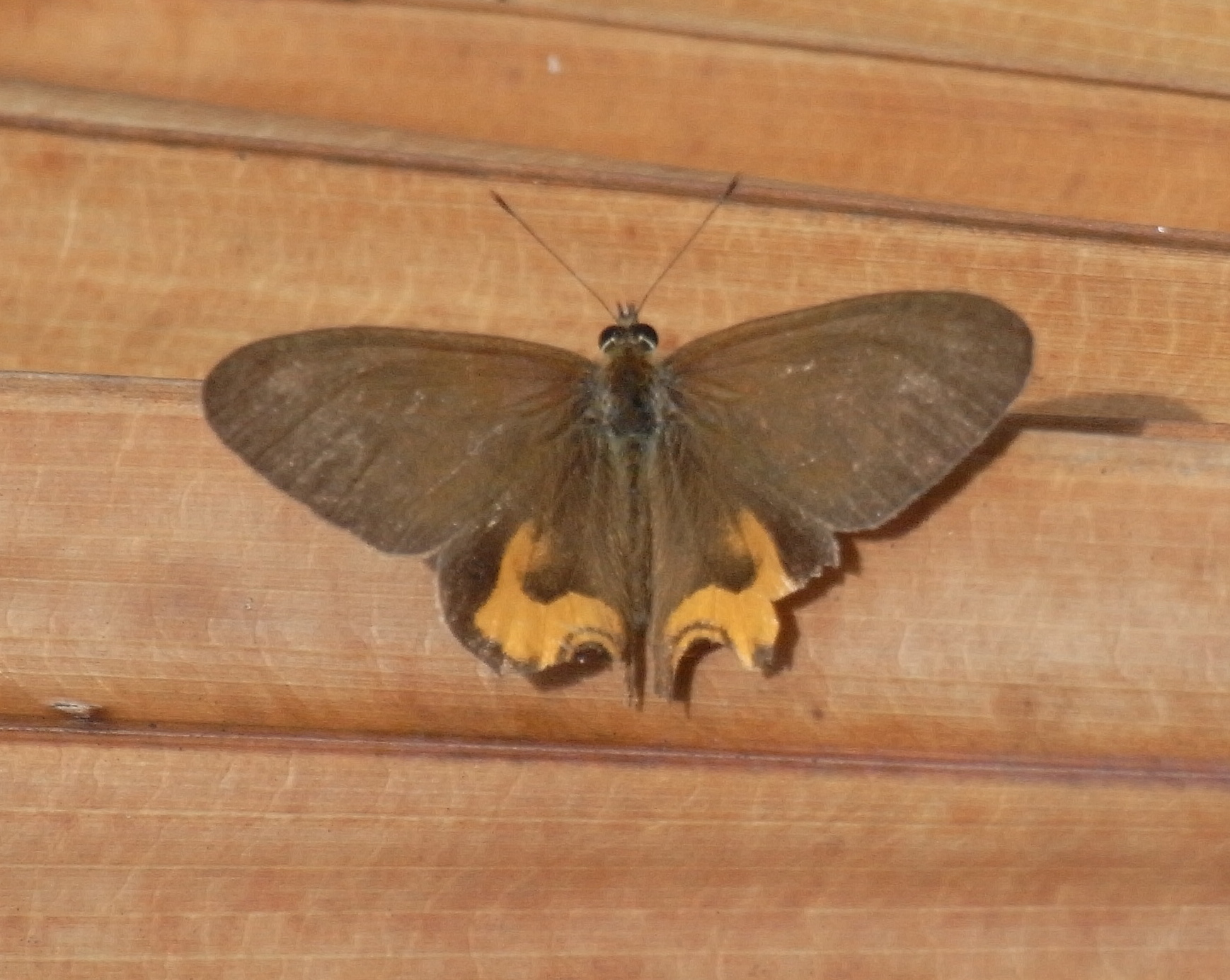

Scientific classification
- Kingdom: Animalia
- Phylum: Arthropoda
- Class: Insecta
- Order: Lepidoptera
- Family: Nymphalidae
- Genus: Hypocysta
- Species: H. metirius

Binomial name
- Hypocysta metirius Butler, 1875

= Hypocysta metirius =

Species of butterfly

Hypocysta metirius, the common brown ringlet, is a species of butterfly of the family Nymphalidae. It is found along the east coast of Australia, including Queensland and New South Wales.

Both male and female Hypocysta metirius have a wingspan of 31 mm. They are brown and have an orange patch on the hindwing with an eyespot. The underside of the hindwing has two eyespots and commonly has a silver spot between them.

They fly low to the ground and frequently stop to open their wings.

== Habitat ==
Hypocysta metirius are found in tall open-forest and at the edges of tropical, subtropical and warm temperate rainforest. In southern New South Wales they can also be found in coastal heath-woodland.

=== Host Plants ===
The larvae of Hypocysta metirius feed on plants of the family Poaceae including:

- Cynodon dactylon
- Eriachne pallescens
- Alexfloydia repens
