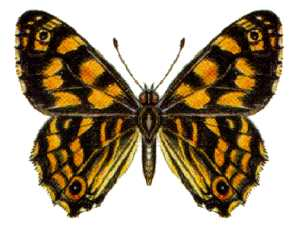
- Oreixenica kershawi

Scientific classification
- Kingdom: Animalia
- Phylum: Arthropoda
- Clade: Pancrustacea
- Class: Insecta
- Order: Lepidoptera
- Family: Nymphalidae
- Subfamily: Satyrinae
- Tribe: Satyrini
- Subtribe: Hypocystina
- Genus: Oreixenica; Waterhouse & Lyell, 1914

Species
- See text

= Oreixenica =

Genus of butterflies

Oreixenica is a genus of butterflies in the family Nymphalidae. The genus contains six species.

== Species ==
- Oreixenica orichora (Meyrick, 1885)
- Oreixenica ptunarra Couchman, 1953
- Oreixenica latialis Waterhouse & Lyell, 1914
- Oreixenica lathoniella (Westwood, [1851])
- Oreixenica correae (Olliff, 1890)
- Oreixenica kershawi (Miskin, 1876)
