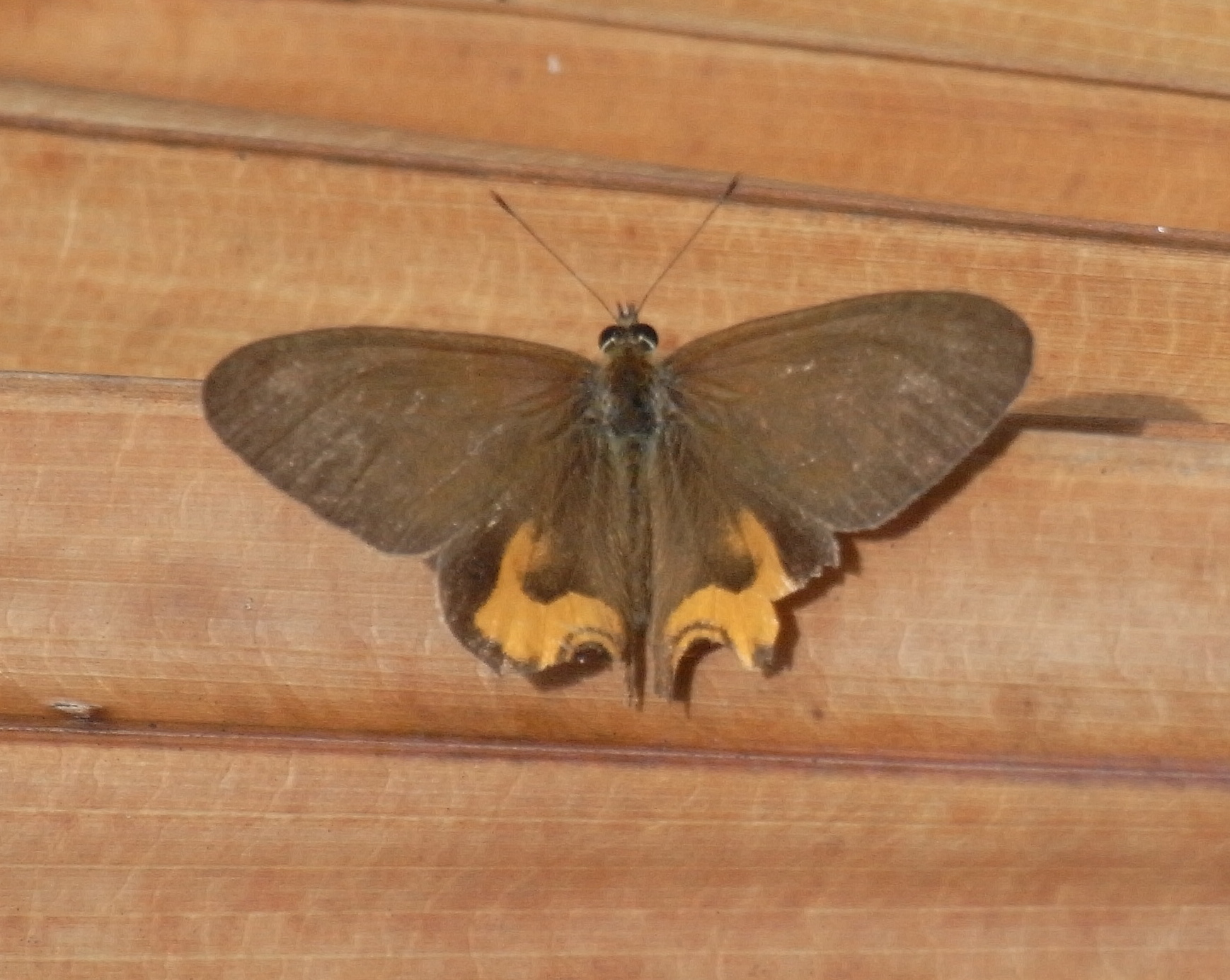
- Hypocysta metirius

Scientific classification
- Domain: Eukaryota
- Kingdom: Animalia
- Phylum: Arthropoda
- Class: Insecta
- Order: Lepidoptera
- Family: Nymphalidae
- Subtribe: Hypocystina
- Genus: Hypocysta; Westwood, [1851]

Species
- See text

= Hypocysta =

Genus of butterflies

Hypocysta is a genus of butterflies in the family Nymphalidae found in Oceania.

== Species ==
The genus contains 12 species.

- Hypocysta adiante (Hübner, 1825) – orange ringlet
- Hypocysta angustata Waterhouse & Lyell, 1914 – black and white ringlet
- Hypocysta aroa Bethune-Baker, 1908
- Hypocysta euphemia Westwood, [1851] – rock ringlet
- Hypocysta haemonia Hewitson, 1863
- Hypocysta irius (Fabricius, 1775) – northern ringlet
- Hypocysta metirius Butler, 1875 – common brown ringlet
- Hypocysta osyris (Boisduval, 1832)
- Hypocysta isis Fruhstorfer, 1894
- Hypocysta calypso Grose-Smith, 1897
- Hypocysta serapis Grose-Smith, 1894
- Hypocysta pseudirius Butler, 1875 – dingy ringlet
