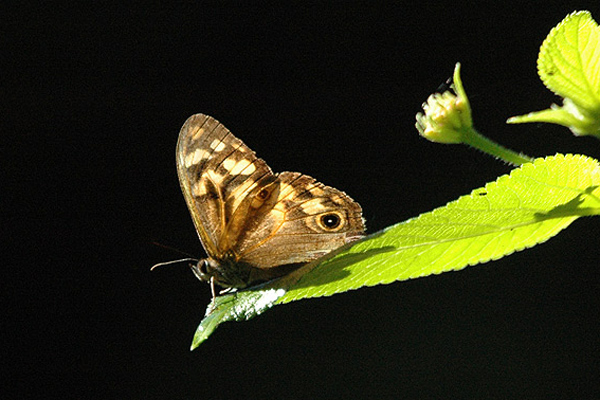

Scientific classification
- Domain: Eukaryota
- Kingdom: Animalia
- Phylum: Arthropoda
- Class: Insecta
- Order: Lepidoptera
- Family: Nymphalidae
- Genus: Heteronympha
- Species: H. banksii

Binomial name
- Heteronympha banksii (Leach, 1814)

= Heteronympha banksii =

Species of butterfly

Heteronympha banksii, or Banks's brown butterfly, is a medium-sized butterfly of the family Nymphalidae found in Australia.
