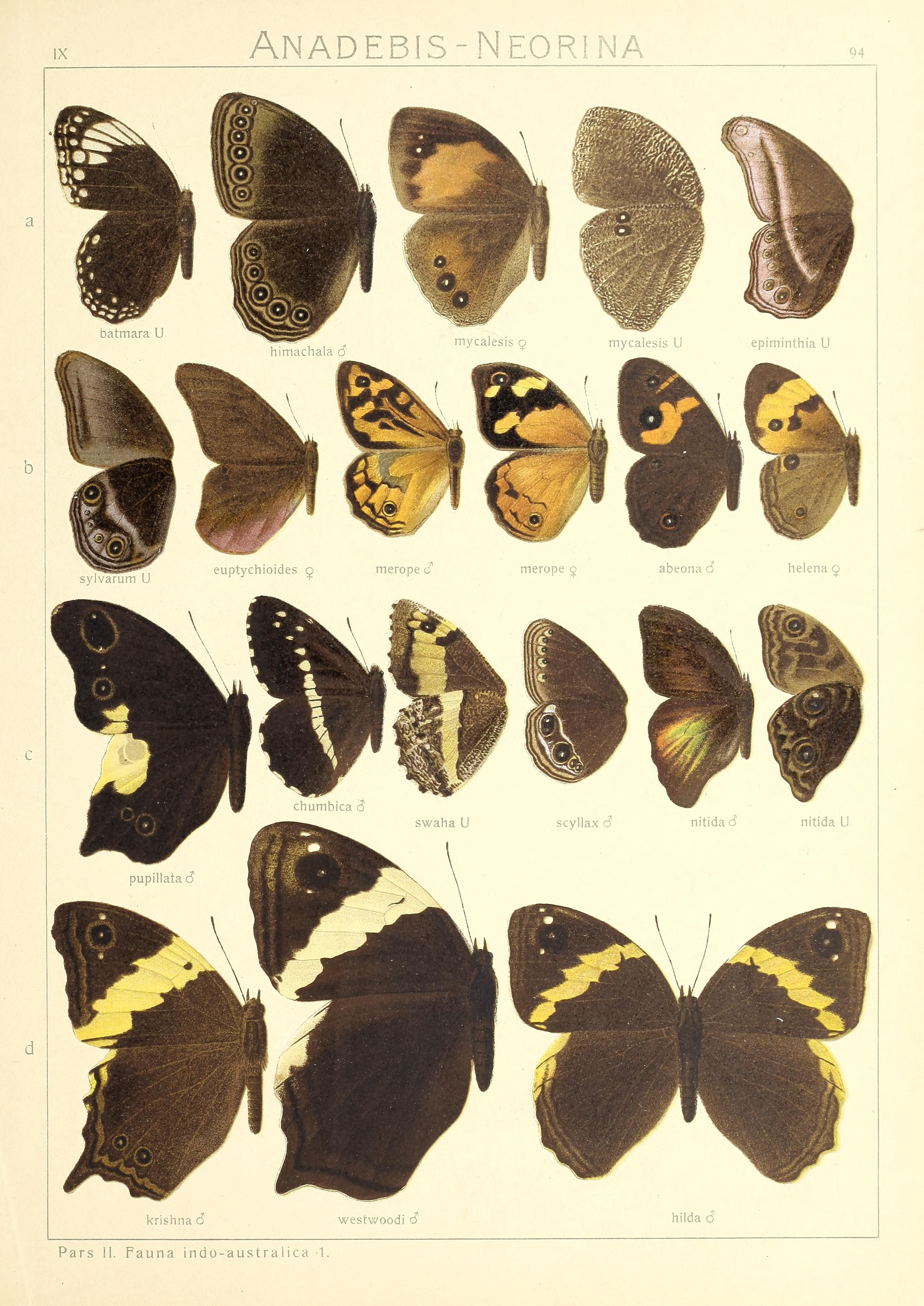
- Lamprolenis nitida' in Seitz

Scientific classification
- Kingdom: Animalia
- Phylum: Arthropoda
- Class: Insecta
- Order: Lepidoptera
- Family: Nymphalidae
- Subtribe: Hypocystina
- Genus: Lamprolenis; Godman & Salvin, 1880
- Species: L. nitida

Binomial name
- Lamprolenis nitida Godman & Salvin, 1880

= Lamprolenis =

Genus of butterflies

Lamprolenis is a monotypic butterfly genus of the subfamily Satyrinae in the family Nymphalidae. Its one species is Lamprolenis nitida.

== Description ==
The figure (see plate right c) shows the characteristic of the species, a wonderful green reflection, which gradually changes distad into a more intensive and. brilliant golden bronze-colour, a decoration with which no other Indo-Australian Satyrid. can even distantly compare. The very rare female is essentially larger, paler brown, the hindwing shows only slight traces of the metallic sheen, but is instead ornamented with a very large black ocellus with brown-yellow border, which is always well developed on the forewing also. In the males as n the example figured, the anal ocellus on the upperside of the hindwing s commonly absent. According to Hagen the species flies in the woods at Astrolabe Bay in March. I Hans Fruhstorfer ] myself have received it from the neighbourhood of Friedrich-Wilhelmshafe.
