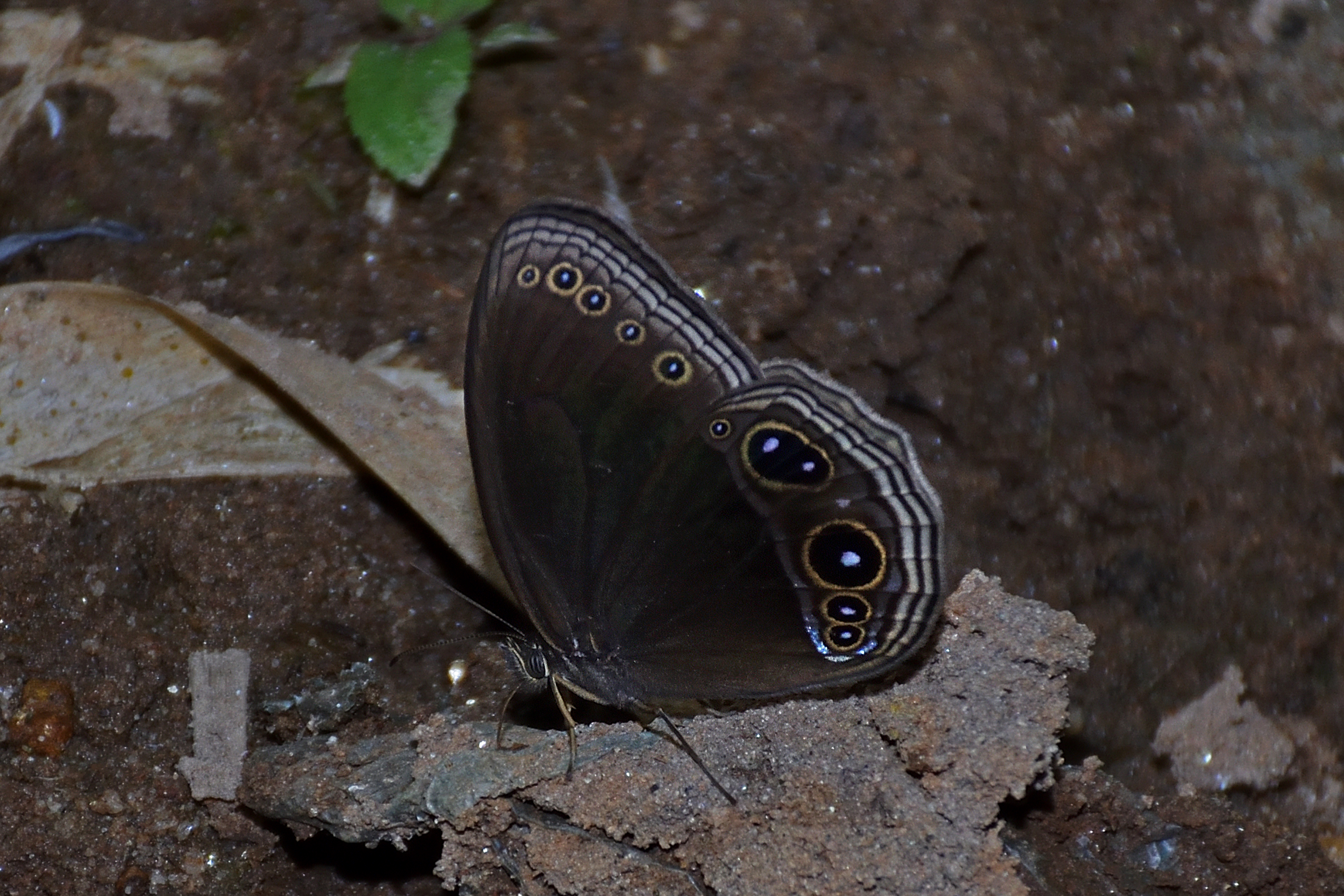

Scientific classification
- Domain: Eukaryota
- Kingdom: Animalia
- Phylum: Arthropoda
- Class: Insecta
- Order: Lepidoptera
- Family: Nymphalidae
- Genus: Zipaetis
- Species: Z. scylax

Binomial name
- Zipaetis scylax Hewitson, 1863

= Zipaetis scylax =

Species of butterfly

Zipaetis scylax, the dark catseye, is a species of butterfly of the family Nymphalidae. It is found from Sikkim to Assam and in northern Burma.

== Subspecies ==
- Zipaetis scylax scylax (Assam)
- Zipaetis scylax hani (southern Yunnan)
