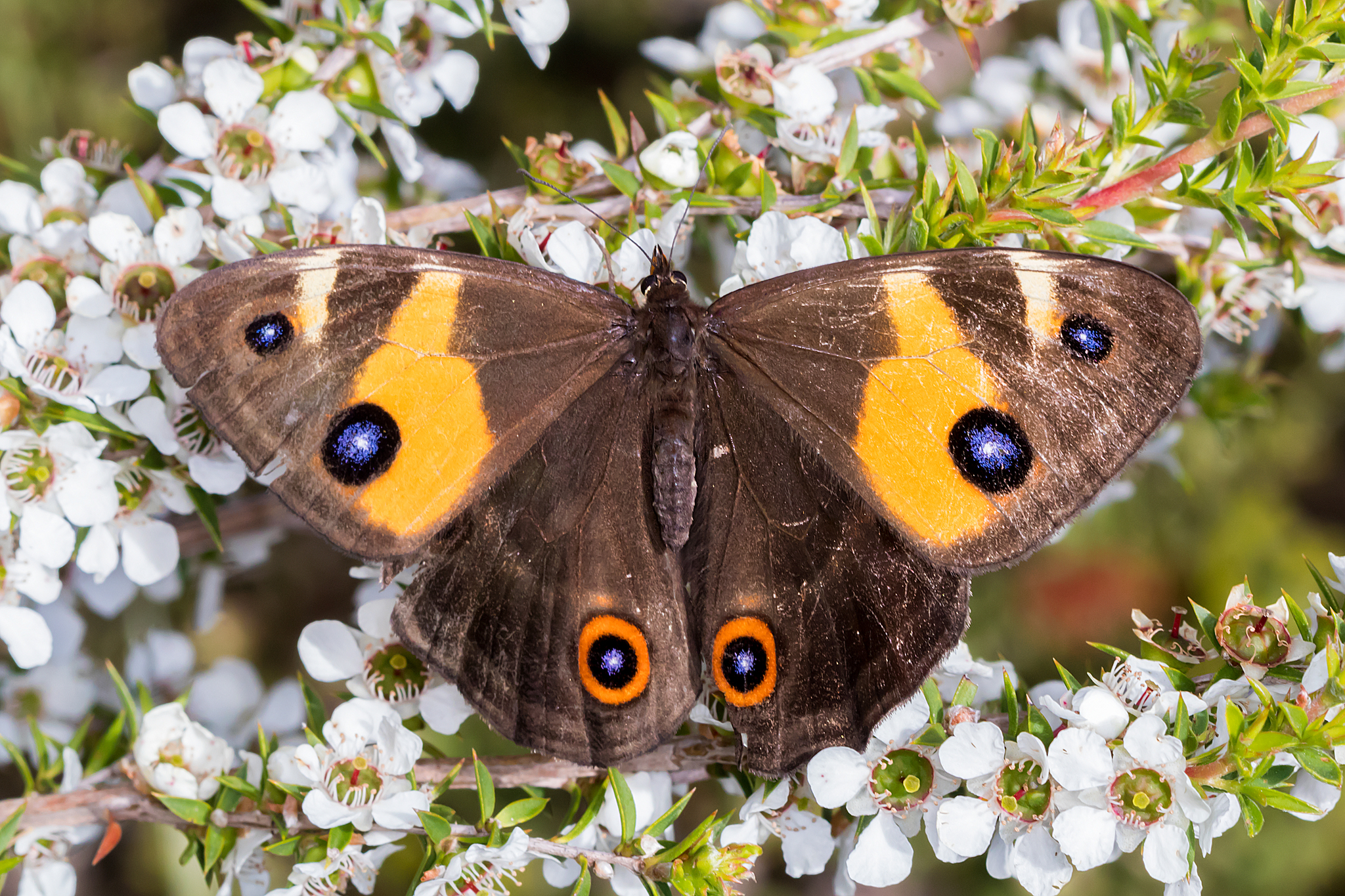

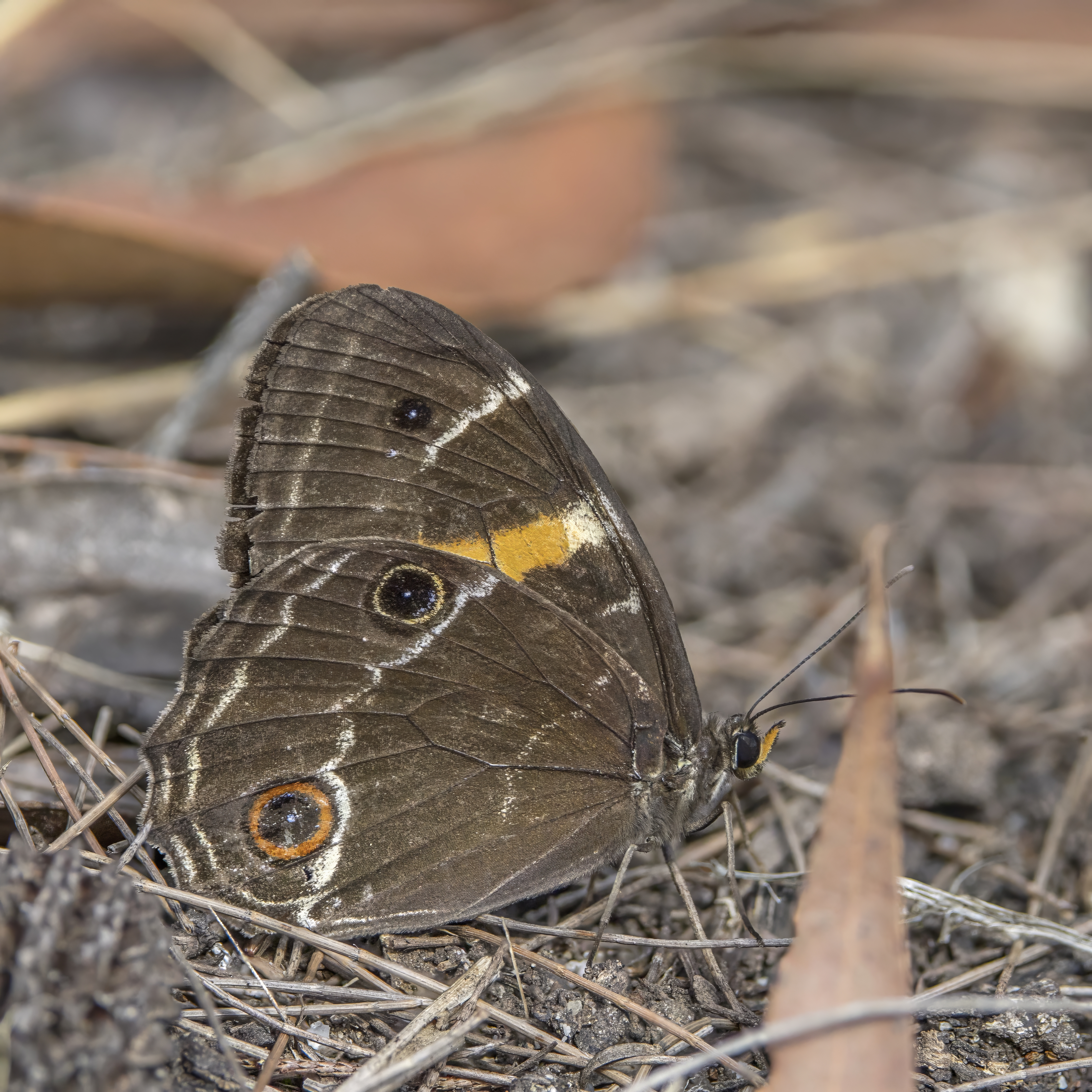

Scientific classification
- Domain: Eukaryota
- Kingdom: Animalia
- Phylum: Arthropoda
- Class: Insecta
- Order: Lepidoptera
- Family: Nymphalidae
- Genus: Tisiphone
- Species: T. abeona

Binomial name
- Tisiphone abeona (Donovan, 1805)

Synonyms
- Papilio abeona Donovan, 1805; Oreas zelinde Hübner, [1808]; Epinephele rawnsleyi Miskin, 1876; Tisiphone regalis Waterhouse, 1928; Enodia joanna Butler, 1866; Tisiphone aurelia Waterhouse, 1915; Tisiphone albifascia Waterhouse, 1904; Tisiphone antoni Tindale, 1947

= Tisiphone abeona =

Species of butterfly

Tisiphone abeona, the swordgrass brown, is a nymphalid butterfly. It is endemic to Australia.

The wings of the adult are brown and have a wingspan of about 60 mm.

The larvae feed on Gahnia species.

== Subspecies ==
- T. a. abeona (Donovan, 1805) (New South Wales, from the Hunter River south)
- T. a. albifascia Waterhouse, 1904 (eastern Victoria)
- T. a. antoni Tindale, 1947 (western Victoria to south-east Australia)
- T. a. aurelia Waterhouse, 1915 (New South Wales, from Camden Haven to Port Stevens)
- T. a. joanna (Butler, 1866) (New South Wales, Port Macquarie)
- T. a. morrisi Waterhouse, 1914 (Queensland, from Southport to New South Wales)
- T. a. rawnsleyi (Miskin, 1876) (Queensland, from Gympie to Caloundra)
- T. a. regalis Waterhouse, 1928 (New South Wales, from the Dorrigo Plateau to the Barrington Tops)
