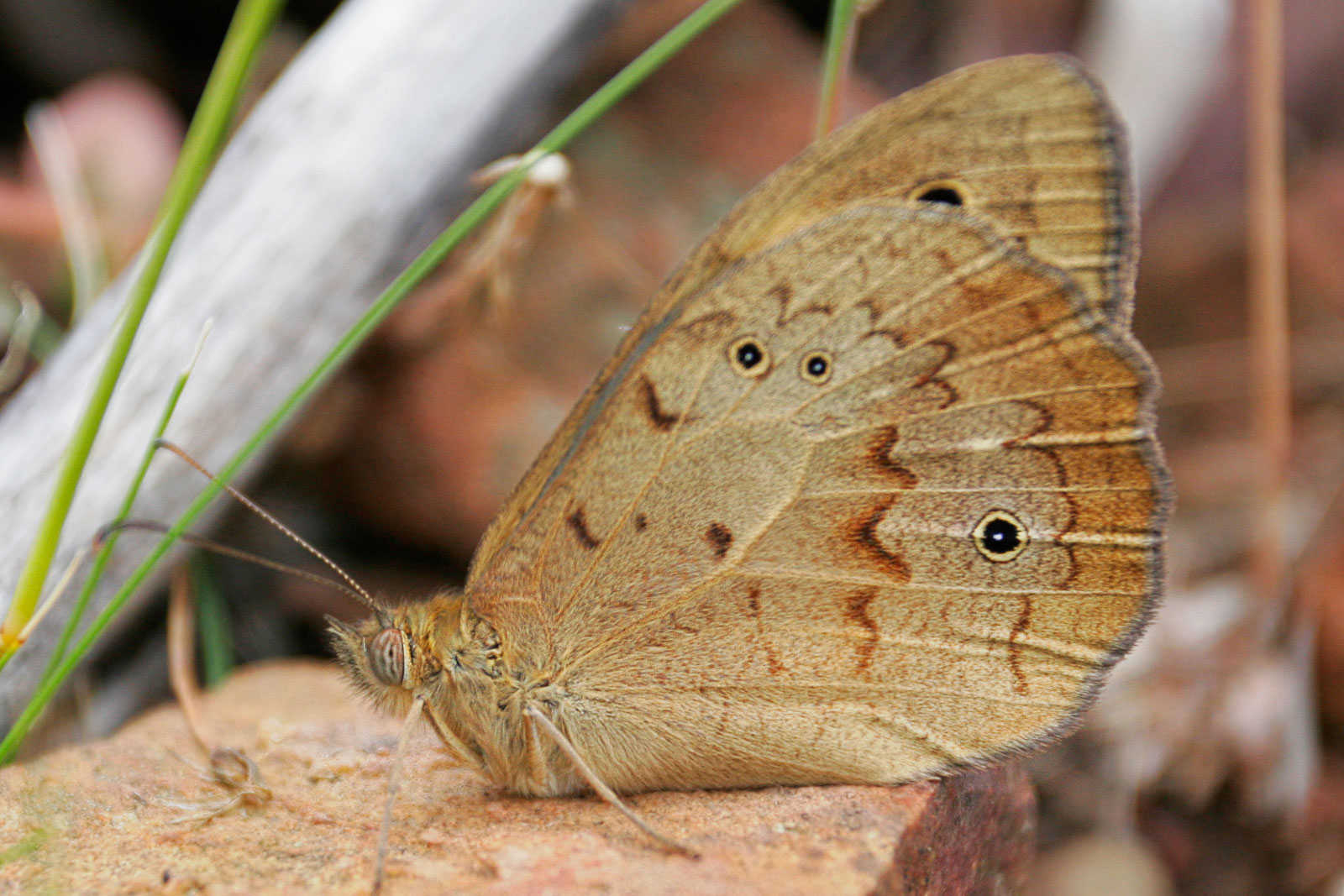

Scientific classification
- Domain: Eukaryota
- Kingdom: Animalia
- Phylum: Arthropoda
- Class: Insecta
- Order: Lepidoptera
- Family: Nymphalidae
- Genus: Geitoneura
- Species: G. klugii

Binomial name
- Geitoneura klugii (Guérin-Méneville, 1830)

= Geitoneura klugii =

Species of butterfly

Geitoneura klugii, the common xenica or Klug's xenica, is a species of butterfly belonging to the family Nymphalidae. It is a southern Australian butterfly that is easily camouflaged because of its resemblance to the ground where it is usually found fluttering. It has a wingspan of about 38 millimetres (1.5 in). The upper and lower side of the forewing is black with brownish-black markings and contains a black spot with a white centre. The orange hindwing is set off by a black border and a black-rimmed eyespot. The underside of the hindwing ranges from grey to brown and consists of darker markings.

== Sexual dimorphism and mating ==
There is not much difference in appearance between the male and female, except for a silvery sex band that runs across the centre of the upperside of the male forewing. Also the females are paler compared to the males. In anticipation of mating, the males either set up their territory on or close to the ground and wait for the females to arrive or they personally go in search for the females. Territorial disputes are common among the males and are expressed by the upward spiral flight of the males.

== Life cycle ==
=== Eggs ===
The eggs are either white or pale yellow in their initial stages and gradually change to a speckled purple within a few days of fertilisation. They have flat base and apex with a moderately thick shell, consisting of 14 to 18 rib-like striations. The laid eggs, however, remain dormant during the hot Australian summers. The larvae begin to develop within the eggs only if the autumn showers wet the eggs, the temperature falls, or the number of daylight hours decreases. The developed larva within the egg does not emerge until the prolonged autumn showers wet the eggs. Once the larva wants to emerge from the egg, it partially cuts open a part of the shell and pushes its way out. In most cases the larva eats the shell to immediately nourish its weak body. It then finds its way to young grass areas to further nourish itself.

=== Larvae ===
In the first stage, the pale grey body of the larva has longitudinal brown lines, a number of black-knobbed hair like structures, a brown head with no horns, and a rear with no fork. In the following stages, the rear develops a fork, the longitudinal lines become green, and the larva itself becomes green. The mature larva is green and about 28 mm long. The feeding habits for the larva extend from winter through early spring. It feeds on grasses like slender tussock grass, kangaroo grass, and false brome.

=== Pupae ===
Come pupation time, the larvae become yellowish green and the longitudinal lines disappear. The pupa stage lasts for 16 to 29 days during late spring and early summer and decreases during the peak summertime. The pupae are 11–13 mm long and pale green. They are suspended head downward from a silken pad at their abdomen, called a cremaster, either from a log, a food plant, or a stick.

== Distribution ==
Geitoneura klugii is found in temperate parts of southern Australia with more than 100 mm of rainfall. They usually reside in cool and damp places with green food availability. They are distributed through southern Queensland, eastern New South Wales, most parts of Tasmania and Victoria, southern Western Australia, and coastal South Australia.

== Etymology ==
The specific and common names honour Johann Christoph Friedrich Klug.
