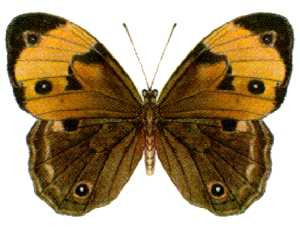

Scientific classification
- Domain: Eukaryota
- Kingdom: Animalia
- Phylum: Arthropoda
- Class: Insecta
- Order: Lepidoptera
- Family: Nymphalidae
- Genus: Tisiphone
- Species: T. helena

Binomial name
- Tisiphone helena (Olliff, 1888)

Synonyms
- Epinephile helena Olliff, 1888

= Tisiphone helena =

Species of butterfly

Tisiphone helena, the Helena brown or northern sword-grass brown, is a nymphalid butterfly. It is endemic to tropical northern Queensland.

The wingspan is about 60 mm.

The larvae feed on Gahnia species, including Gahnia sieberiana.
