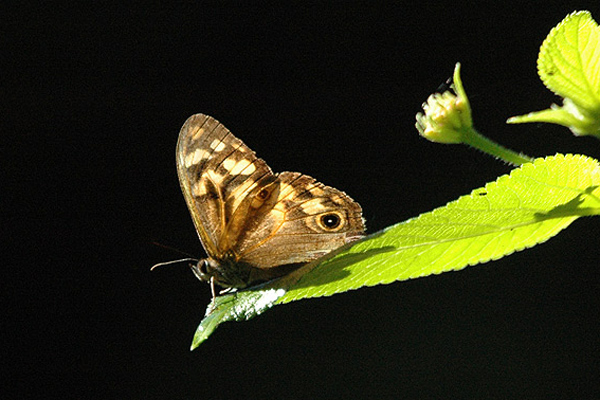
- Heteronympha banksii

Scientific classification
- Domain: Eukaryota
- Kingdom: Animalia
- Phylum: Arthropoda
- Class: Insecta
- Order: Lepidoptera
- Family: Nymphalidae
- Tribe: Satyrini
- Subtribe: Coenonymphina
- Genus: Heteronympha; Wallengren, 1858

Species
- See text

Synonyms
- Hipparchioides Butler, 1867

= Heteronympha =

Genus of butterflies

Heteronympha is a genus of butterflies in the family Nymphalidae. The genus contains seven species.

== Species ==
Listed alphabetically:

- Heteronympha banksii Leach, 1814
- Heteronympha cordace Geyer, 1832
- Heteronympha merope Fabricius, 1775
- Heteronympha mirifica Butler, 1866
- Heteronympha paradelpha Lower, 1893
- Heteronympha penelope Waterhouse, 1937
- Heteronympha solandri Waterhouse, 1904
