= Theclinesthes albocincta =

Scientific classification
- Kingdom: Animalia
- Phylum: Arthropoda
- Clade: Pancrustacea
- Class: Insecta
- Order: Lepidoptera
- Family: Lycaenidae
- Genus: Theclinesthes
- Species: T. albocincta

Binomial name
- Theclinesthes albocincta (Waterhouse, 1903)

Synonyms
- Utica onycha var. albocincta Waterhouse, 1903

Species of butterfly

Theclinesthes albocincta, the bitterbush blue or bitter-bush blue, is a species of butterfly native to most of Australia.

== Description ==
The Bitterbush Blue is a small butterfly, with wingspan of the male about 22mm and female about 21mm. Adult males are bluish-grey, with a black spot behind the tornus of each hindwing, while females are brown with some variable blue areas around the bases of their wings. Both sexes have chequered margins and a small tail at the tornus of each hindwing. The butterflies are pale brown underneath with wriggly white lines.

The colour and markings of this butterfly are highly variable. The areal extent of blue areas on upper sides of wings of the coastal form butterfly is variable, and reduces for butterflies located further from the coast or in hot dry areas. The underside colour may be yellowish, brownish, or vary from pale to dark grey, and underside markings are also variable. Butterflies flying in winter are often much darker on the underside (sometimes black and white) and, in some populations, the upper side colour is dark grey rather than blue.

The eggs are small, hemispherical, flattened top and bottom, initially pale green but later turning bluish.

The caterpillar grows to a length of about 11-13mm, and is green or brown, with a broad pink dorsal stripe with white borders. The first instar is initially pale greenish yellow with numerous long hairs, and change colour after eating the host plant. Later instars are onisciform (slater shaped) with a few short lateral hairs. The colour and markings of larvae are highly variable, being green, pink, purple, brown, or combinations thereof, affected by the part of the host plant (e.g. flower heads versus leaves) being eaten.

Pupae are shaped as short cylinders, with some short bristles, about 9-11mm long, and coloured various shades of brown with darker speckled markings that are more concentrated on thorax, head, and wings. Winter-formed pupae may be nearly black.

== Distribution ==
The species has been found in most of Australia, including Western Australia, Northern Territory, New South Wales, Victoria, and South Australia. Preferred habitats include sand dunes near salt-lakes, and the ecotone between flood plain, woodland, and mallee scrubland in inland areas, preferring open areas where the larval food plants grow. Its status is described as common but very local.. There are three documented geographical forms - an inland form, a southern coastal form predominantly in South Australia, and an eastern form in Queensland. The full-blue colouring of the butterfly is observed only in coastal areas, and the brown in inland areas. The population in the Gawler Ranges of South Australia is a mix of blue and brown forms.

Within South Australia, the species has a patchy distribution restricted to areas that support health of its larval host plants of the genus Adriana, and the coastal distribution is restricted to areas with the Bitterbush (Adriana quadripartia). Population numbers have been found to be directly linked with Adriana plant growth stages, health, and site densities.

== Life cycle ==
The caterpillars feed predominantly on the Bitterbush or, in inland areas, the Mallee Bitterbush.. They are often attended by a variety of ants of various genera including Dolichoderus, Iridomyrmex, Ochetellus, Camponotus, Melophorus, Notoncus, Polyrhachis, Myrmecia, Crematogaster, Monomorium, and Rhytidoponera.

Larvae feed openly during the day or night, and prefer eating flower buds of male plants, but will readily eat other parts of the plant when male flowers are unavailable. A survey in South Australia reported egg and larval presence on male plants with inflorescence, with no presence on female plants. The larvae will sometimes loosely silk together leaves or similar debris to make a flimsy cocoon or space to pupate within.

Pupae attach by anal hooks and a central girdle to a silked substrate that is usually on dead leaf and other debris within or beneath the host plant. In temperate areas, pupation period is 7-15 days in warmer months and extends up to 42 days in winter.

The flight period may occur year-round, but is usually between spring and autumn, so rarely observed during winter. In coastal areas, flight numbers build up during hotter months, so they are rarely seen flying in early spring but are quite common in summer to early autumn. In hot dry areas flight numbers tend to be higher in spring and early summer, if host plants are in good condition. Continuous broods occur, and are completed in 3-6 weeks during summer depending on location, while a winter brood may take 15 weeks to complete.

Adults fly rapidly within 2 metres of the ground, usually near or settling in the larval food plant or nearby shrubs, and readily feeding from flowers Several overlapping generations have been observed annually in Northwest Victoria and Coastal South Australia. The darker winter butterfly colouration butterflies is thought due to increased melanin content being acquired during a longer early larval stage period in a cold environment and has yet to be produced with pupa in captivity.
