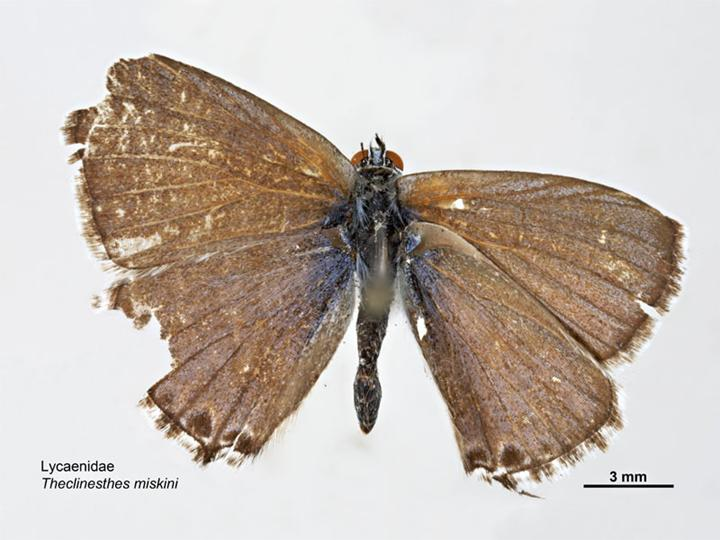
- Dorsal view
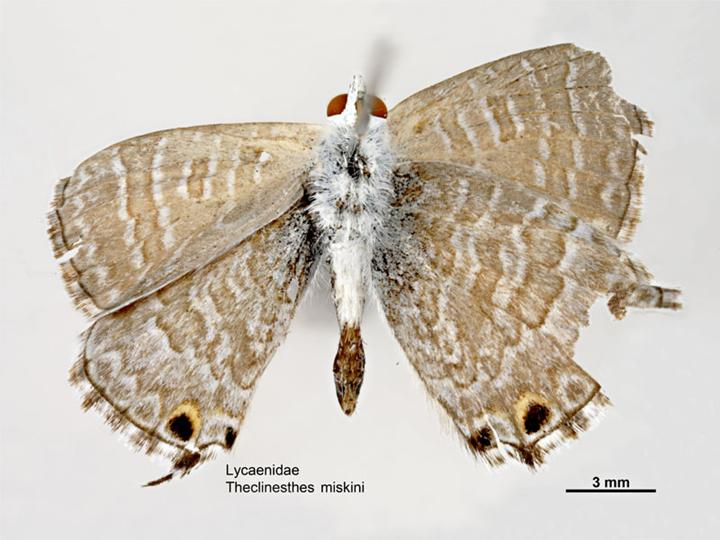
- Ventral view

Scientific classification
- Domain: Eukaryota
- Kingdom: Animalia
- Phylum: Arthropoda
- Class: Insecta
- Order: Lepidoptera
- Family: Lycaenidae
- Genus: Theclinesthes
- Species: T. miskini

Binomial name
- Theclinesthes miskini (T. P. Lucas, 1889)

Synonyms
- Lycaena miskini T. P. Lucas, 1889; Nacaduba gaura Doherty, 1891; Utica onycha var. atrosuffusa Waterhouse, 1903; Theclinesthes eucalypti Sibatani & Grund, 1978; Nacaduba arnoldi Fruhstorfer, 1916

= Theclinesthes miskini =

Species of butterfly

Theclinesthes miskini, the wattle blue, is a butterfly of the family Lycaenidae. It is found in Australia and New Guinea.

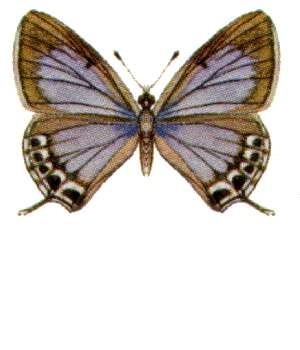
Theclinesthes miskini

== Description ==
The wingspan is about 20 mm.

The larvae are dark green or brown with a dark dorsal band and pale diagonal streaks.

== Ecology ==
The larvae generally feed on plants in the family Fabaceae including Paraserianthes lophantha, Sesbania cannabina, Acacia anceps, A. auriculiformis, A. flavescens, A. pycnantha, A. salicina, A. saligna, A. tetragonophylla, A. harpophylla, A. holosericea, A. neriifolia and A. victoriae, but also on Alectryon diversifolius, Atalaya variifolia, Hakea vittata and Eucalyptus polycarpa. Young seedlings are preferred to older foliage.

Larvae are occasionally attended by various black or green ants in the genera Iridomyrmex, Ochetellus, Calomyrmex, Camponotus, Notoncus, Paratrechina or Polyrhachis.

== Subspecies ==
- Theclinesthes miskini miskini (Australia: Cairns to Moruya, Northern Territory)
- Theclinesthes miskini arnoldi (Fruhstorfer, 1916) (Cape York, Bismarck Archipelago)
- Theclinesthes miskini eucalypti Sibatani & Grund, 1978 (Queensland)
