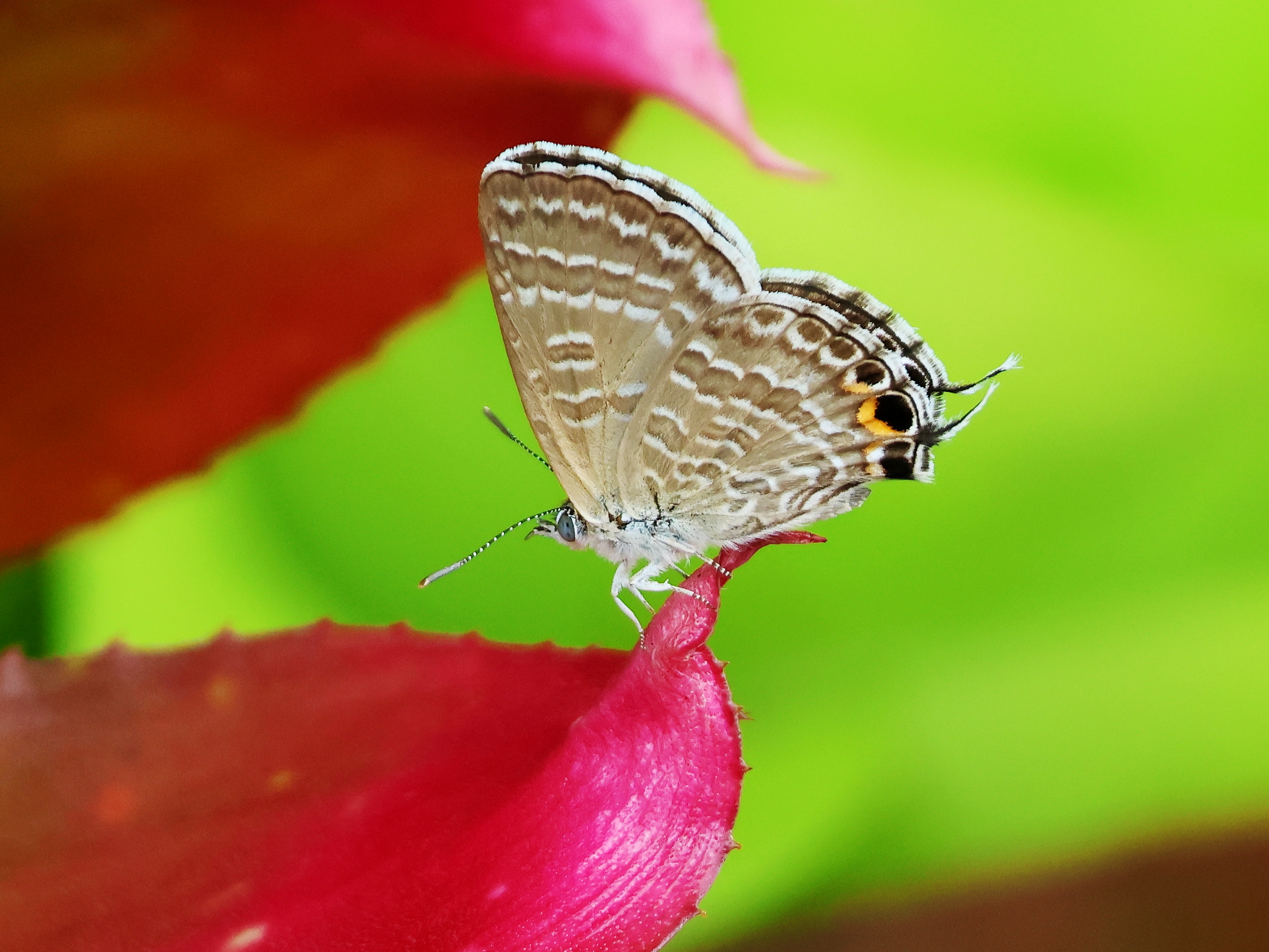
- Cycad blue, Cairns, Queensland

Scientific classification
- Kingdom: Animalia
- Phylum: Arthropoda
- Class: Insecta
- Order: Lepidoptera
- Family: Lycaenidae
- Genus: Theclinesthes
- Species: T. onycha

Binomial name
- Theclinesthes onycha Hewitson, 1865

= Theclinesthes onycha =

Species of butterfly

Theclinesthes onycha, the cycad blue is a small butterfly found in Eastern Australia, coastal and inland from Cape York Peninsula to the southern-most part of New South Wales.

== Gallery ==
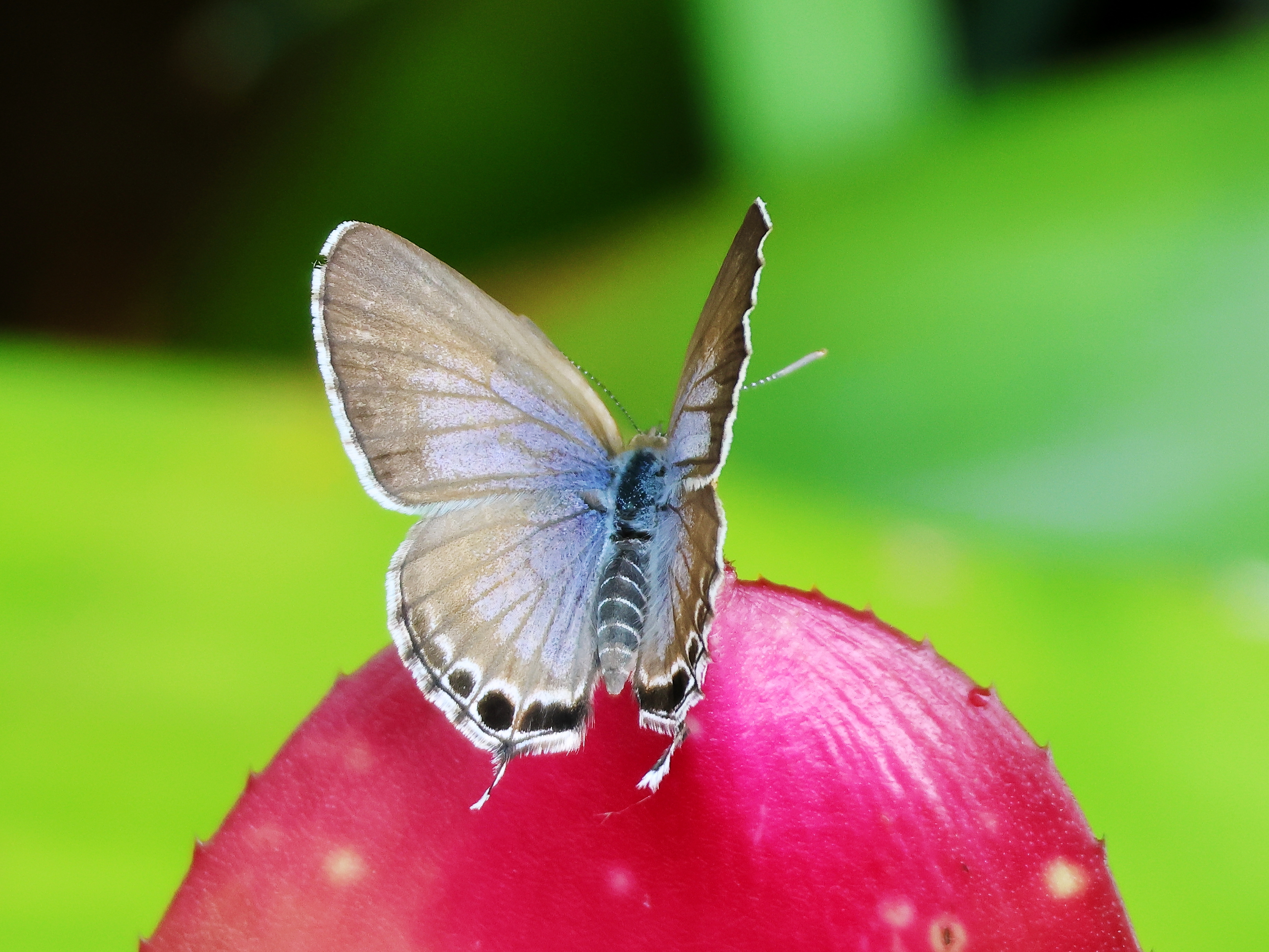
Cairns, Queensland

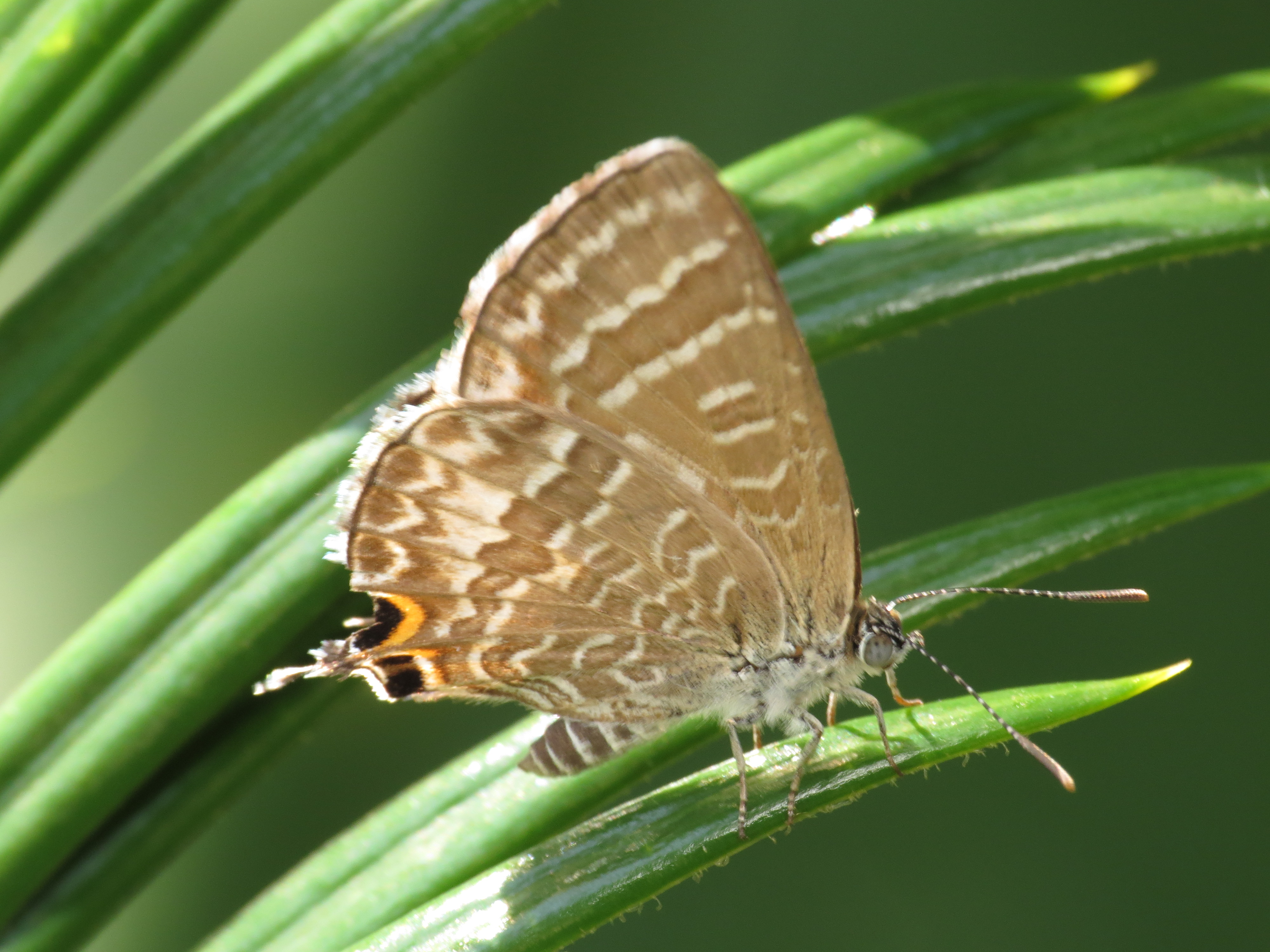
Mission Beach, Queensland
