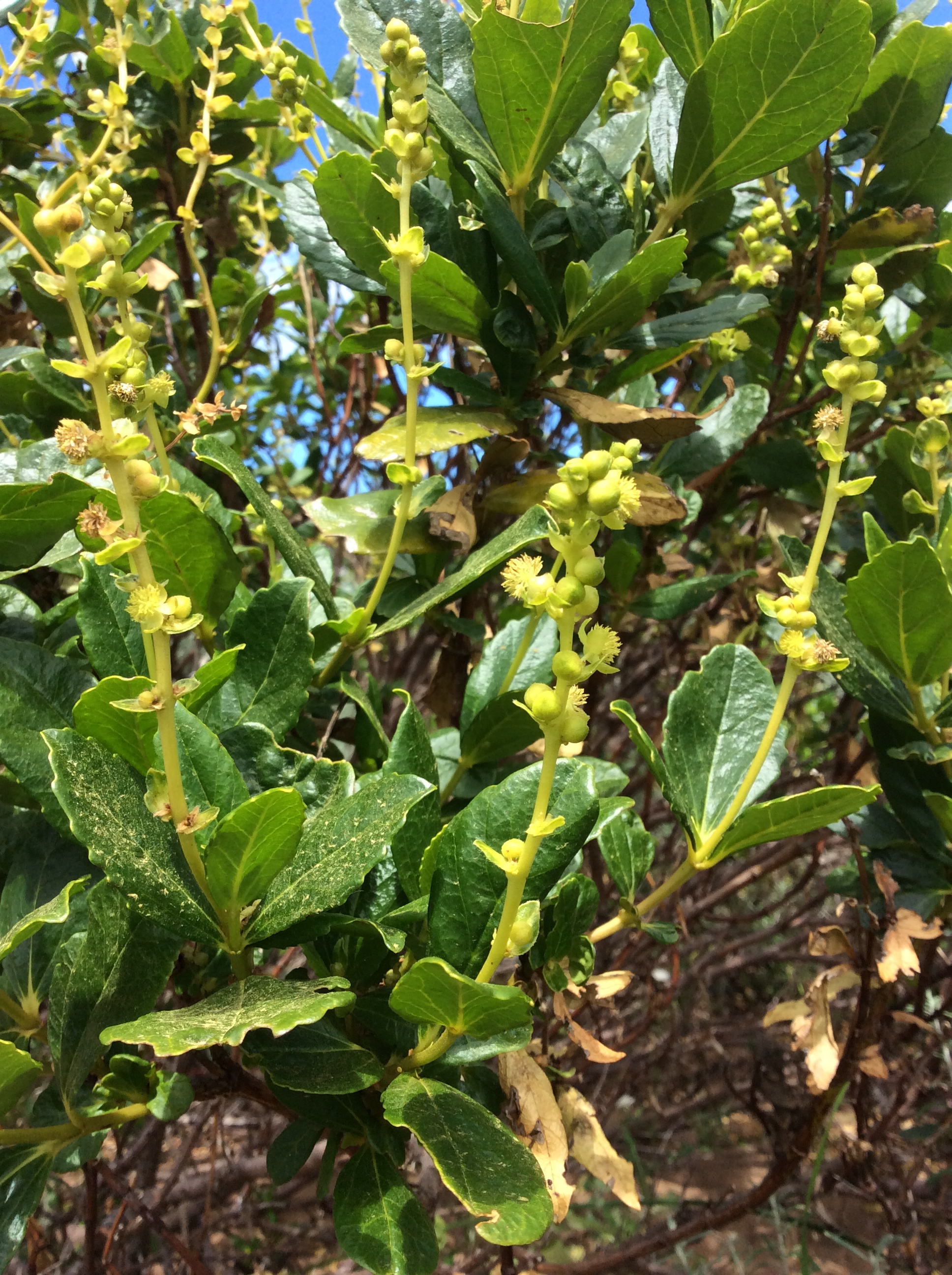

Scientific classification
- Kingdom: Plantae
- Clade: Embryophytes
- Clade: Tracheophytes
- Clade: Spermatophytes
- Clade: Angiosperms
- Clade: Eudicots
- Clade: Rosids
- Order: Malpighiales
- Family: Euphorbiaceae
- Genus: Adriana
- Species: A. quadripartita

Binomial name
- Adriana quadripartita (Labill.) Muell.Arg.

Synonyms
- Adriana bloudowskyana Mull.Arg. ex Pax; Adriana klotzschii (F.Muell.) Mull.Arg.; Croton quadripartitus Labill.; Trachycaryon klotzschii F.Muell.

= Adriana quadripartita =

Species of plant

Adriana quadripartita, the bitter bush, is a shrub in the family Euphorbiaceae. The species, which is endemic to southern Australia, has an erect open habit, growing to between 0.5 and 3 metres or more high.

The lanceolate or ovate leaves are opposite, coarsely toothed and have a glabrous upper surface. They are 5 to 10 cm long and 2 to 4 cm wide. The male flower spikes are up to 17 cm long. The female flowers, which occur on separate plants, appear in clusters. These are followed by ovoid capsules which are about 1 centimetre in diameter.

== Forms ==
There are two recognised forms, one with wholly glabrous leaves and another pubescent form with leaves which are whitish tomentose on the underside.

=== Glabrous form ===
This form, also known as rare bitter-bush or Adriana quadripartita sensu stricto, occurs in Western Australia, South Australia and in Victoria where it reaches its eastern limit at Port Phillip heads. This form is listed as "threatened" in Victoria under the Flora and Fauna Guarantee Act 1988.

=== Pubescent form ===
This form, also known as coast bitter-bush, is sometimes recognised as a species in its own right – Adriana klotzchii. It occurs on sand dunes along the coast of South Australia and into Victoria as far east as Wilsons Promontory. In South Australia, flowers are mostly produced in spring but may appear year round. This form is a host plant of the bitter-bush blue butterfly (Theclinesthes albocincta).

== Cultivation ==
The species can be propagated by cuttings. The pubescent form may be used as a protective screen planting against salt-spray in coastal areas.

== Gallery ==
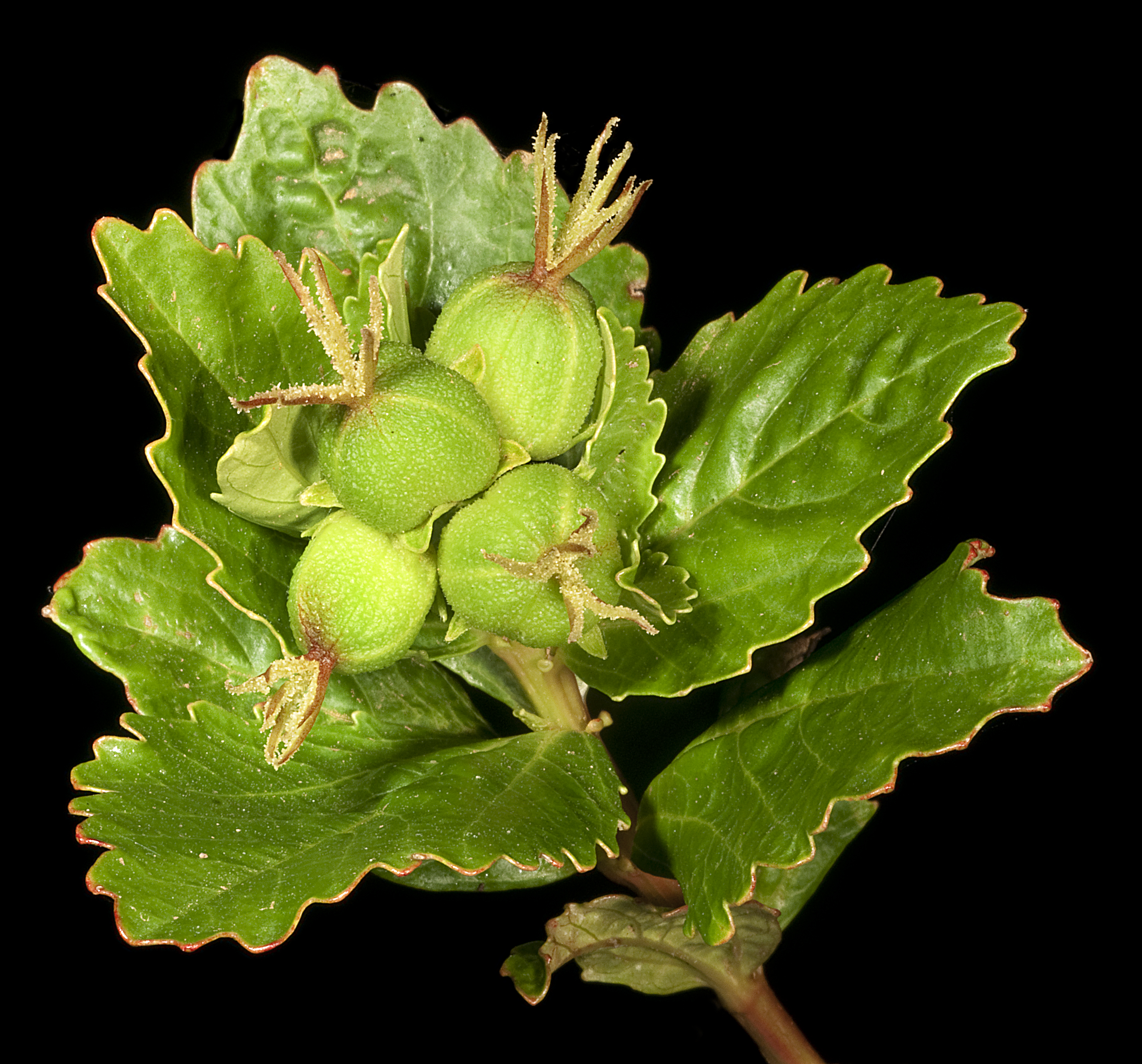
kvinna

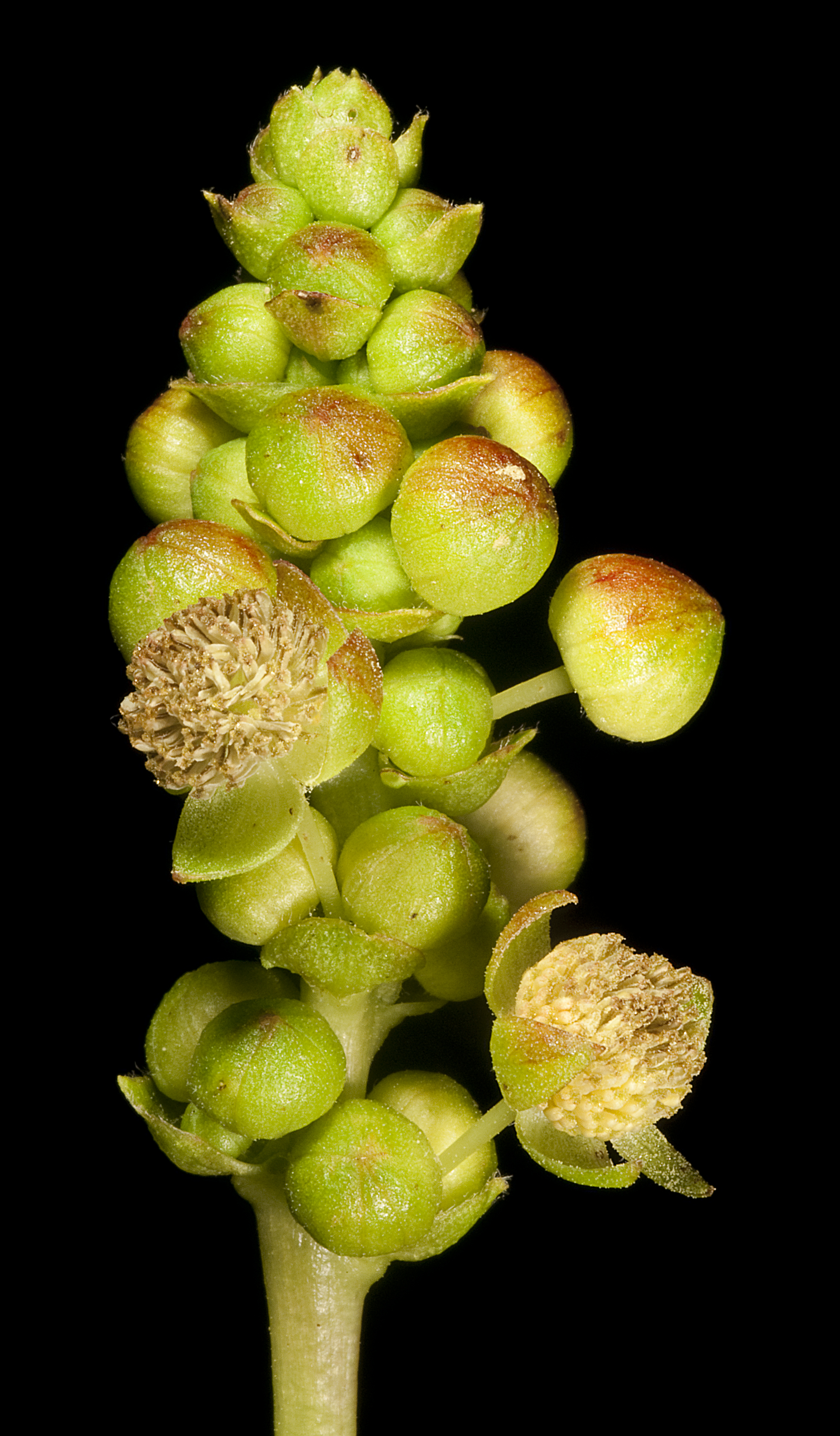
Male
