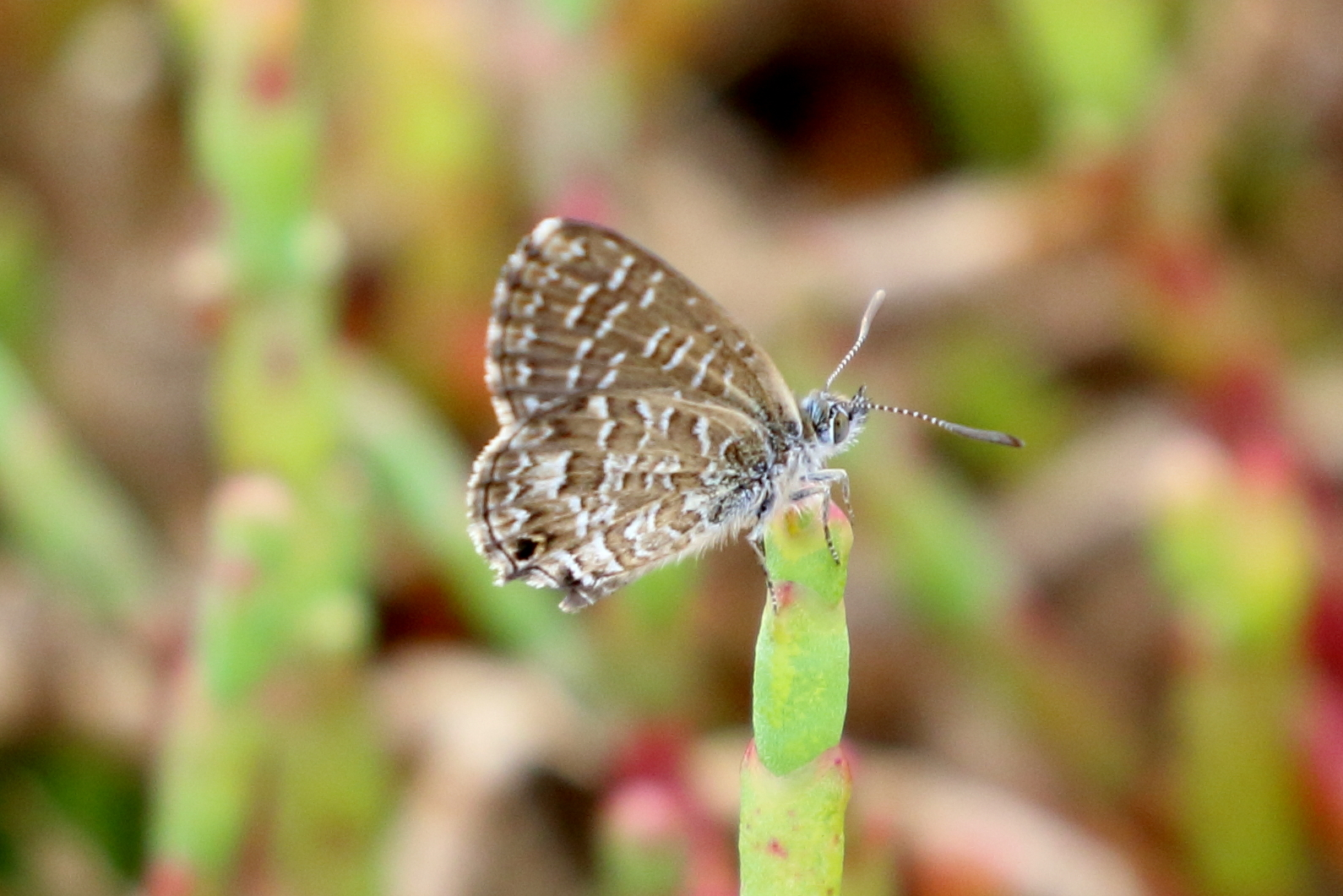
- Theclinesthes sulpitius

Scientific classification
- Domain: Eukaryota
- Kingdom: Animalia
- Phylum: Arthropoda
- Class: Insecta
- Order: Lepidoptera
- Family: Lycaenidae
- Subfamily: Polyommatinae
- Tribe: Polyommatini
- Genus: Theclinesthes; Röber, 1891

Synonyms
- Utica Hewitson, [1865]

= Theclinesthes =

Butterfly genus in family Lycaenidae

Theclinesthes is a genus of butterflies in the family Lycaenidae. The species of this genus are found in the Australasian realm.

== Species ==
- Theclinesthes albocincta (Waterhouse, 1903)
- Theclinesthes eremicola (Röber, 1891)
- Theclinesthes hesperia Sibatani & Grund, 1978
- Theclinesthes miskini (Lucas, 1889)
- Theclinesthes onycha (Hewitson, 1865)
- Theclinesthes serpentata (Herrich-Schäffer, 1869)
- Theclinesthes sulpitius (Miskin, 1890)
