= Tribe (taxonomy) =

Taxonomic rank between family and genus

The hierarchy of biological classification's eight major taxonomic ranks. Intermediate minor rankings are not shown.

In biology, a tribe is a taxonomic rank above genus, but below family and subfamily. It is sometimes subdivided into subtribes. By convention, taxa ranked above species are capitalized, including tribes and subtribes.

== History ==
The taxonomic rank of tribe was not introduced by a single identifiable author. Although Carl Linnaeus established the basis of the hierarchical classification system used in modern biology, he consistently employed only five principal ranks: kingdom, class, order, genus, and species. Later naturalists expanded this hierarchy by introducing additional ranks, including family and tribe.

In zoology, the term tribe was already being used in the 18th century, but its hierarchical position was not yet standardized. In his 1777 work, Introductio ad historiam naturalem, Giovanni Antonio Scopoli assigned the name Amphibia to the rank of tribe, whereas Linnaeus had classified a similar group as a class. Historical studies of zoological nomenclature note that some early authors placed tribes above the rank of order, while others used the term for groups between order and family. Consequently, these early usages did not always correspond to the modern position of tribe below family and above genus.

In botany, Adrien-Henri de Jussieu proposed the name Zanthoxyleae in 1827 without explicitly assigning it a taxonomic rank. In 1829, Barthélemy Charles Joseph Dumortier explicitly assigned the name to the rank of tribe, an early documented example of its formal use in botanical nomenclature.

The rank subsequently became part of the standardized hierarchies used in biological classification. Its nomenclatural conventions differ among zoology, botany, and bacteriology. In modern zoology, tribe is one of the ranks within the family group, alongside superfamily, family, subfamily, and subtribe.

== Rank recognition ==
An unfamiliar taxonomic rank cannot necessarily be identified as a tribe merely by the presence of one of the standard suffixes: (Note: Italics in section "Rank recognition" indicate lexical rather than taxonomic distinctions.)

- zoological -ini uniquely suffixes the animal tribe
- zoological -ina uniquely suffixes the animal subtribe
- zoological -inae uniquely suffixes the animal subfamily
- botanical -eae also suffixes class -phyceae, suborder -ineae, family -aceae, and subfamily -oideae (these additional -eae ranks are present in bacteria, plants, algae, and fungi, but not animals)

Accordingly, working within animals alone, subfamily -inae, tribe -ini, and subtribe -ina are unique suffixes to their specific taxonomic ranks. At the other extreme, working within algae alone, -eae suffixes class -phyceae, suborder -ineae, family -aceae, subfamily -oideae, and tribe -eae. The longer suffixes themselves suffixed with -eae must first be eliminated before recognizing an unfamiliar -eae designation as belonging to rank tribe.

== See also ==
- Taxonomy (biology)
- Nomenclature codes
