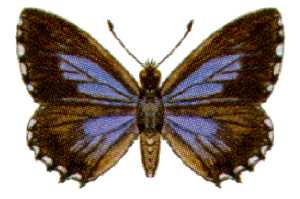

Scientific classification
- Domain: Eukaryota
- Kingdom: Animalia
- Phylum: Arthropoda
- Class: Insecta
- Order: Lepidoptera
- Family: Lycaenidae
- Genus: Theclinesthes
- Species: T. serpentata

Binomial name
- Theclinesthes serpentata G. A. W. Herrich-Schäffer 1869

= Theclinesthes serpentata =

Species of butterfly

Theclinesthes serpentata, commonly known as the saltbush blue or chequered blue, is a species of butterfly in the family Lycaenidae that is native to Australia. The species was first described in 1869 by German entomologist and physician G. A. W. Herrich-Schäffer. It is common throughout all Australian states and territories, and can be found in a wide range of habitats.

== Description ==
This is a very small butterfly, with a wingspan of 18 mm (0.71 in) for both male and female specimens. On the top side, the wings have broad margins of brown, with blue colouration towards the thorax. The underside is brown with patches of white. Male and female specimens have the same colouration, which ranges from mid to dark brown and purple-blue to blue. The larvae grow to 9mm in length, with a textured skin surface and colouration ranging from pale green to grey-green. The caterpillars blend in with their host plant, the saltbush, but have black and yellow stripes lining their back that can distinguish them.

== Ecology ==
The saltbush blue has a wide distribution, due to their preferential food plant being dispersed across biomes and states. Thus, the butterfly occupies a diverse range of habitats and tolerates arid, temperate, and urban environments. Its diet consists mainly of the saltbush species, with larvae eating its leaves and flowers, but adults can also consume some weed species. Because of this, the butterfly spends most of its life around the saltbush and can be found flying close to the plant in seasonal flowering months. The exact lifespan of the saltbush blue is unknown.

== Evolution ==
The skin texture of the larvae matches with the surface of the leaf, camouflaging it. The texturisation suggests the species has undergone specialised evolution in response to selective pressures. The size of the butterfly and its wing shape are also evolutionary traits. The small size of the saltbush blue is in response it spending the majority of its life, from egg to adult, around one preferred food plant.

== Life history ==
The eggs are pale green with a diameter of 0.6 mm (0.024 in) and a microscopic diamond-shaped outside texture. They can be found in singles on the flower buds or leaves of saltbush plants. Once hatched, the caterpillar eats the leaves and flowers of the plant, growing up to 9mm long before pupation. The pupa, green with brown markings, attaches to a food leaf and grows to 7mm. Once the butterfly emerges, it continues to eat the leaves and flowers of the saltbush plants.

== Distribution ==
In saltbush landscapes, it can be the most abundant species of butterfly in the region.

== Threats ==
Some threats to saltbush blue populations are climate change and habitat destruction. Climate change raises the temperature of the region, to which butterflies are particularly susceptible. Butterflies rely on temperature indicators to hatch and to breed, and higher temperatures may change breeding period lengths and time of emergence. Habitat destruction can also reduce butterfly populations, and cause local extinctions. This occurs when food plants are completely removed from an area, such as for agriculture or urbanisation.
