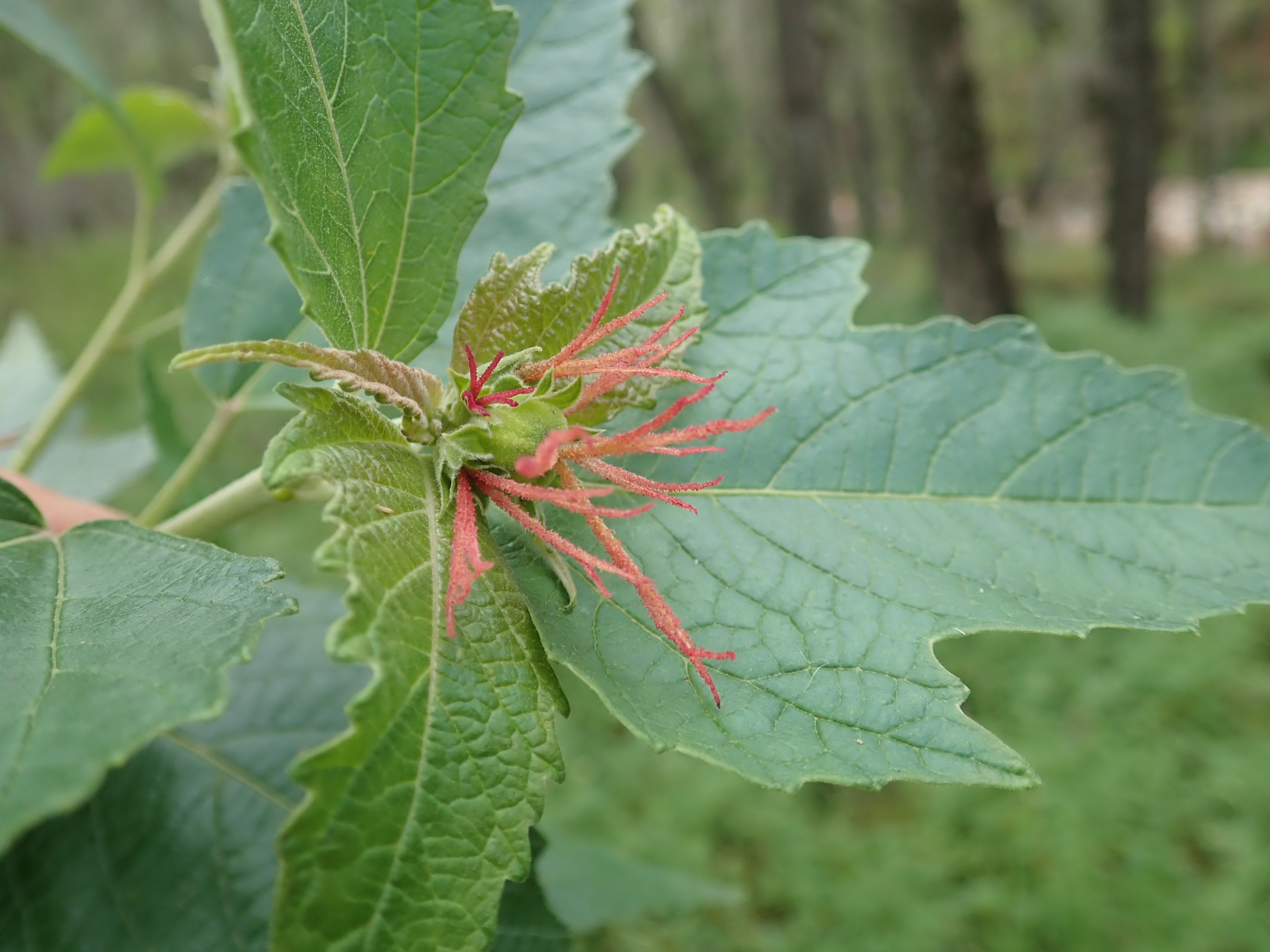
- Female flowers

Scientific classification
- Kingdom: Plantae
- Clade: Tracheophytes
- Clade: Angiosperms
- Clade: Eudicots
- Clade: Rosids
- Order: Malpighiales
- Family: Euphorbiaceae
- Genus: Adriana
- Species: A. tomentosa

Binomial name
- Adriana tomentosa Gaudich.
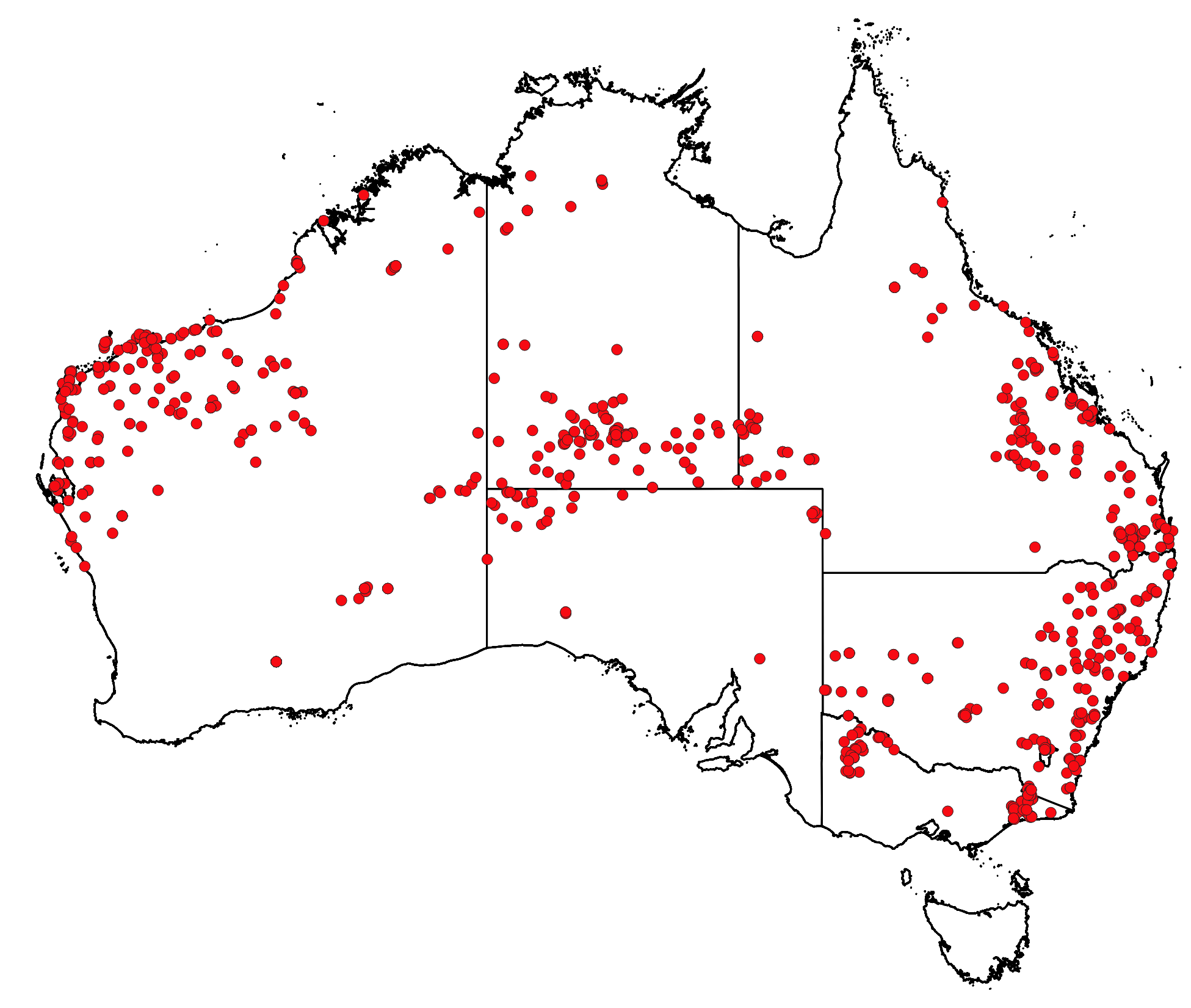
- Occurrence data from AVH

Synonyms
- Adriana gaudichaudii Baill.; Adriana gaudichaudii var. genuina Baill.; Ricinus tomentosus Thunb.

= Adriana tomentosa =

Species of flowering plant

Adriana tomentosa (common name - Mallee bitterbush) is a species of plant in the Euphorbiaceae family and is endemic to mainland Australia.

It was first described by Charles Gaudichaud-Beaupré in 1825.

== Description ==
Adriana tomentosa is a shrub to about 2 m high. Male and female flowers are on separate plants.

== Gallery ==
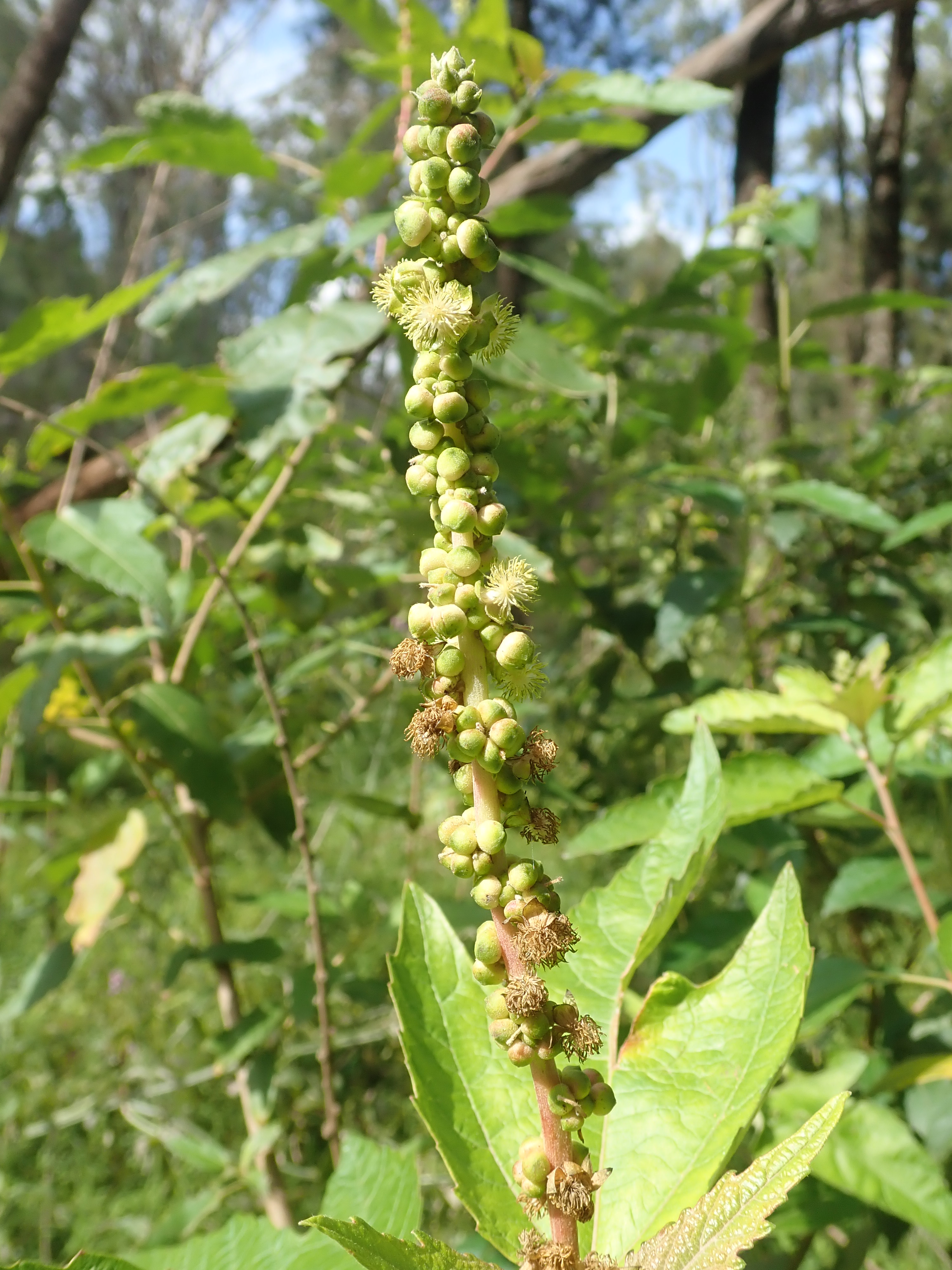
Male flowers

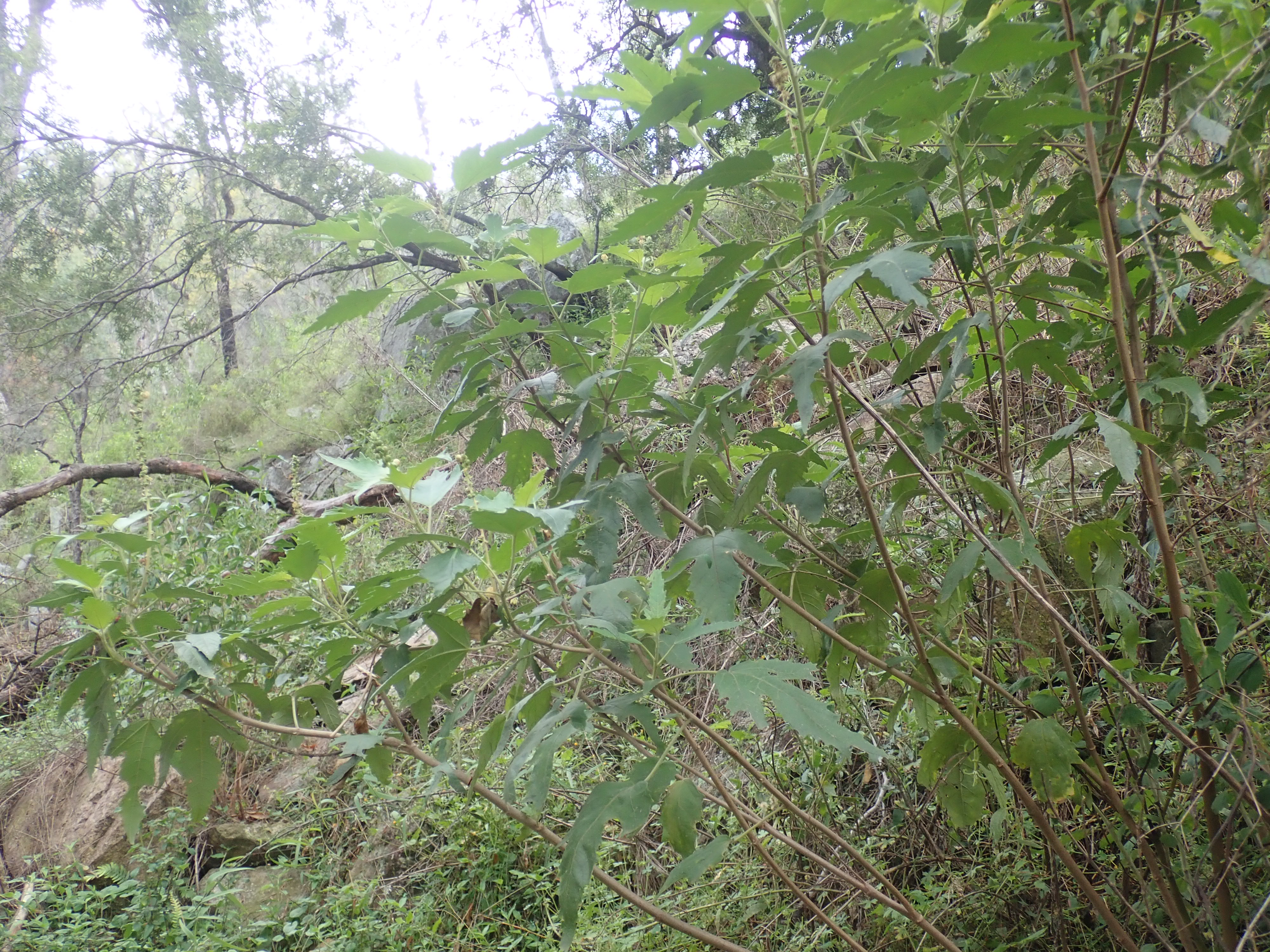
Habit of male plant
