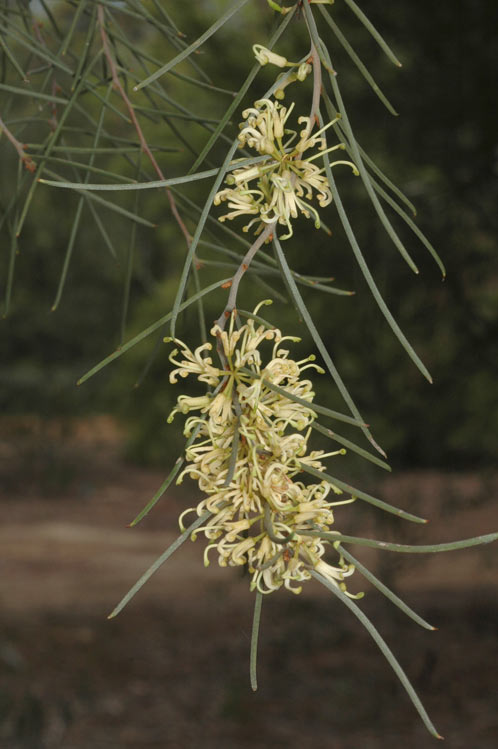

Scientific classification
- Kingdom: Plantae
- Clade: Tracheophytes
- Clade: Angiosperms
- Clade: Eudicots
- Order: Proteales
- Family: Proteaceae
- Genus: Hakea
- Species: H. vittata

Binomial name
- Hakea vittata R.Br.

Synonyms
- Hakea vittata var. vittata R.Br.

= Hakea vittata =

Striped hakea

Species of shrub endemic to Australia

Hakea vittata, commonly known as the striped hakea, hooked needlewood, is a shrub of the family Proteaceae. Restricted to an area on the Eyre Peninsula and the Gawler Range in South Australia and small areas in eastern Victoria.

== Description ==
Hakea vittata is a prostrate or straggly shrub typically growing to a height of 0.1 to 2 metres (0 to 7 ft) that forms a lignotuber. White smooth branchlets are covered with short soft hairs. Needle-like leaves 2–8 cm (0.8–3 in) long and 0.8–1.5 mm (0.03–0.06 in) wide are smooth and straight ending in a point 1–2.5 mm (0.04–0.1 in) long. An inflorescence of 8-14 reddish-white flowers appear in leaf axils. The red-brown main flower stalk is 0.5–3 mm (0.02–0.1 in) long and covered in short soft hairs that lie flat. The hairs continue onto the individual flower stems that are 2.5–0.35 mm (0.1–0.01 in) long. Sepals and petals are white and the style 9.2–11.5 mm (0.4–0.5 in) long. Woody brown fruit may be smooth, wrinkled or warty, egg-shaped 1.3 to 2.4 cm (0.5 to 0.9 in) long and 0.9 to 1.5 cm (0.35 to 0.59 in) wide ending with a small blister-like beak topped by short prominent horns. Hakea vittata has two characteristics that distinguish it from other species in the genus, the presence of "witches broom" galls where it has a mass of dense shoots growing from a single point. Secondly the fruit splitting past the seed tip only on the side of the red-brown wood zone. Flowering occurs from August to November.

== Taxonomy and naming ==
Hakea vittata was first formally described by the botanist Robert Brown as part of the work On the natural order of plants called Proteaceae as published in the Transactions of the Linnean Society of London. The specific epithet (vittatus) is a Latin word for longitudinally-striped, referring to the markings on the fruit.

The only synonym is Hakea vittata var. vittata.

== Distribution and habitat ==
Hooked needle-wood is found in the southern regions of South Australia from Kangaroo Island and Fleurieu Peninsula growing mostly in sandy mallee scrub on limestone.
