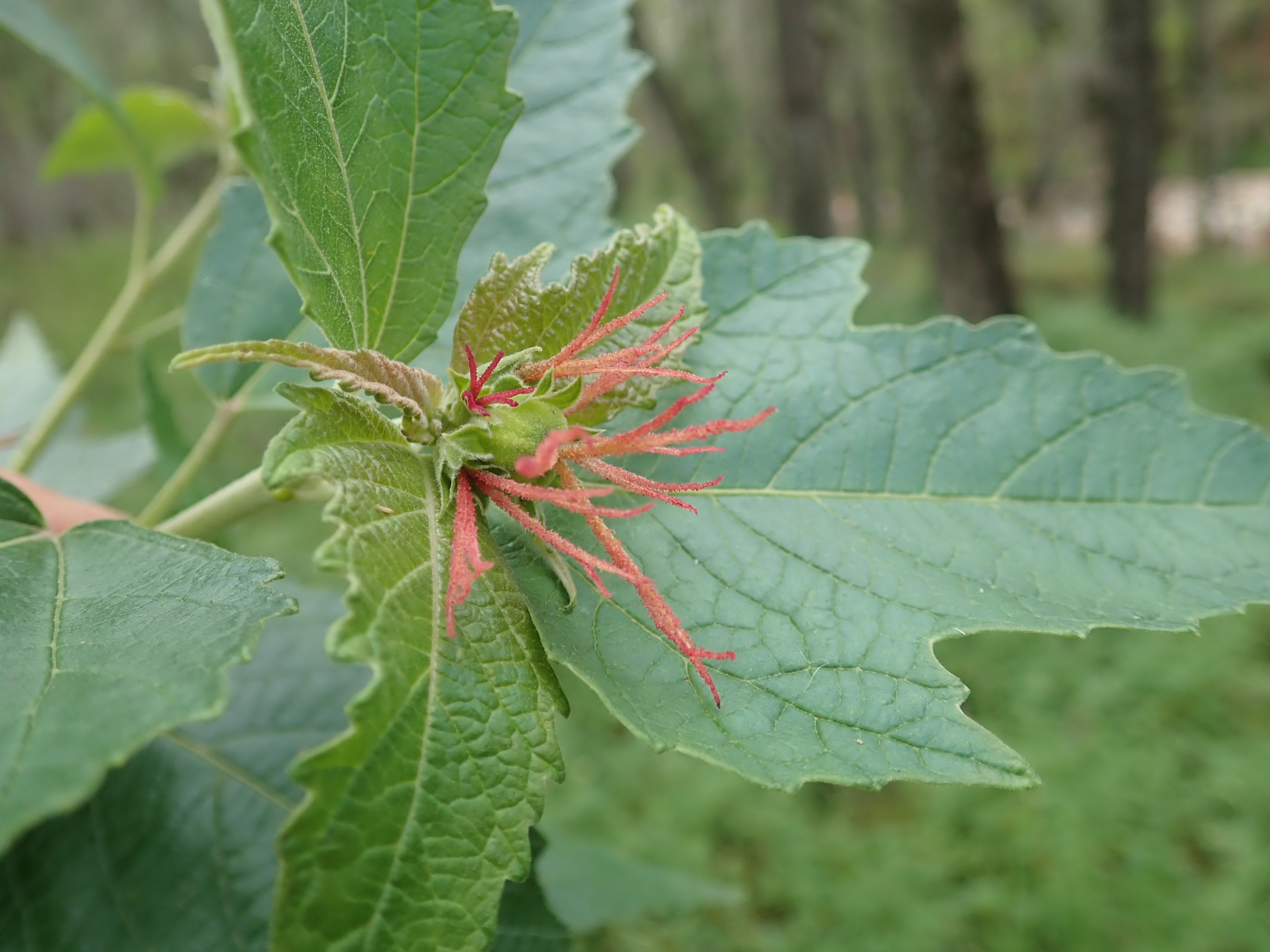
- Adriana tomentosa (female flowers)

Scientific classification
- Kingdom: Plantae
- Clade: Tracheophytes
- Clade: Angiosperms
- Clade: Eudicots
- Clade: Rosids
- Order: Malpighiales
- Family: Euphorbiaceae
- Subfamily: Acalyphoideae
- Tribe: Acalypheae
- Subtribe: Adrianinae
- Genus: Adriana; Gaudich.

Type species
- Adriana tomentosa Gaudich.

Synonyms
- Meialisa Raf.; Trachycaryon Klotzsch

= Adriana (plant) =

Genus of flowering plants

Adriana is a genus of shrubs in the family Euphorbiaceae, first described as a genus in 1825. The entire genus is endemic to Australia.

Species

- Adriana quadripartita (Labill.) Mull.Arg. – South Australia, Victoria, southern Western Australia
- Adriana tomentosa Gaudich. – All mainland states
- Adriana urticoides (A.Cunn.) Guymer ex P.I.Forst. – Northern Territory plus all states except Tasmania

The genus name of Adriana is in honour of Adrien-Henri de Jussieu (1797–1853), a French botanist.
