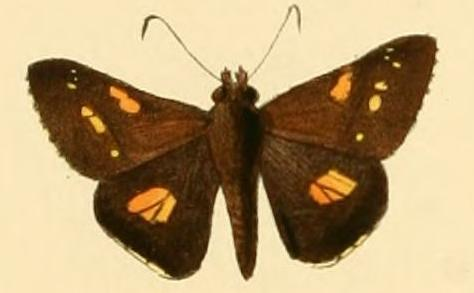

Scientific classification
- Kingdom: Animalia
- Phylum: Arthropoda
- Class: Insecta
- Order: Lepidoptera
- Family: Hesperiidae
- Genus: Hesperilla
- Species: H. donnysa

Binomial name
- Hesperilla donnysa Hewitson, 1868

= Hesperilla donnysa =

Species of butterfly

Hesperilla donnysa, also known as the donnysa skipper or varied sedge skipper, is a species of butterfly in the family Hesperiidae. It is found in the Australian Capital Territory, New South Wales, Queensland, South Australia, Tasmania, Victoria and Western Australia.

The wingspan is about 30 mm for males and 35 mm for females.

The larvae feed on various sword grass species, including Gahnia sieberiana. Other recorded food plants include Gahnia decomposita, Gahnia aspera, Gahnia clarkei, Gahnia deusta, Gahnia erythrocarpa, Gahnia filifolia, Gahnia grandis, Gahnia lanigera, Gahnia microstachya, Gahnia radula, Gahnia subaequiglumis and Gahnia trifida.

== Subspecies ==
- Hesperilla donnysa galena (around Geraldton, Western Australia)
- Hesperilla donnysa albina (south-western Western Australia)
- Hesperilla donnysa aurantia (Tasmania and local islands)
- Hesperilla donnysa donnysa (Australian Capital Territory, New South Wales, Queensland, South Australia, Tasmania, Victoria)
  - Synonyms:
  - Hesperilla donnysa diluta
  - Hesperilla donnysa icaria
  - Hesperilla donnysa patmos
  - Hesperilla donnysa samos
  - Hesperilla donnysa delos
