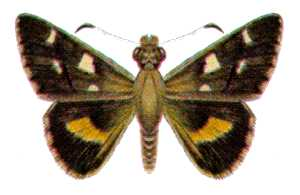

Scientific classification
- Kingdom: Animalia
- Phylum: Arthropoda
- Class: Insecta
- Order: Lepidoptera
- Family: Hesperiidae
- Genus: Hesperilla
- Species: H. ornata

Binomial name
- Hesperilla ornata (Leach, 1814)

Synonyms
- Hesperia ornata Leach, 1814; Telesto monotherm Lower, 1907; Hesperilla monotherma Lower, 1908 (emend.)

= Hesperilla ornata =

Species of butterfly

Hesperilla ornata, also known as the spotted skipper or spotted sedge-skipper, is a species of butterfly in the family Hesperiidae. It is found along the non-tropical eastern seaboard of mainland Australia and in the adjacent mountain ranges.

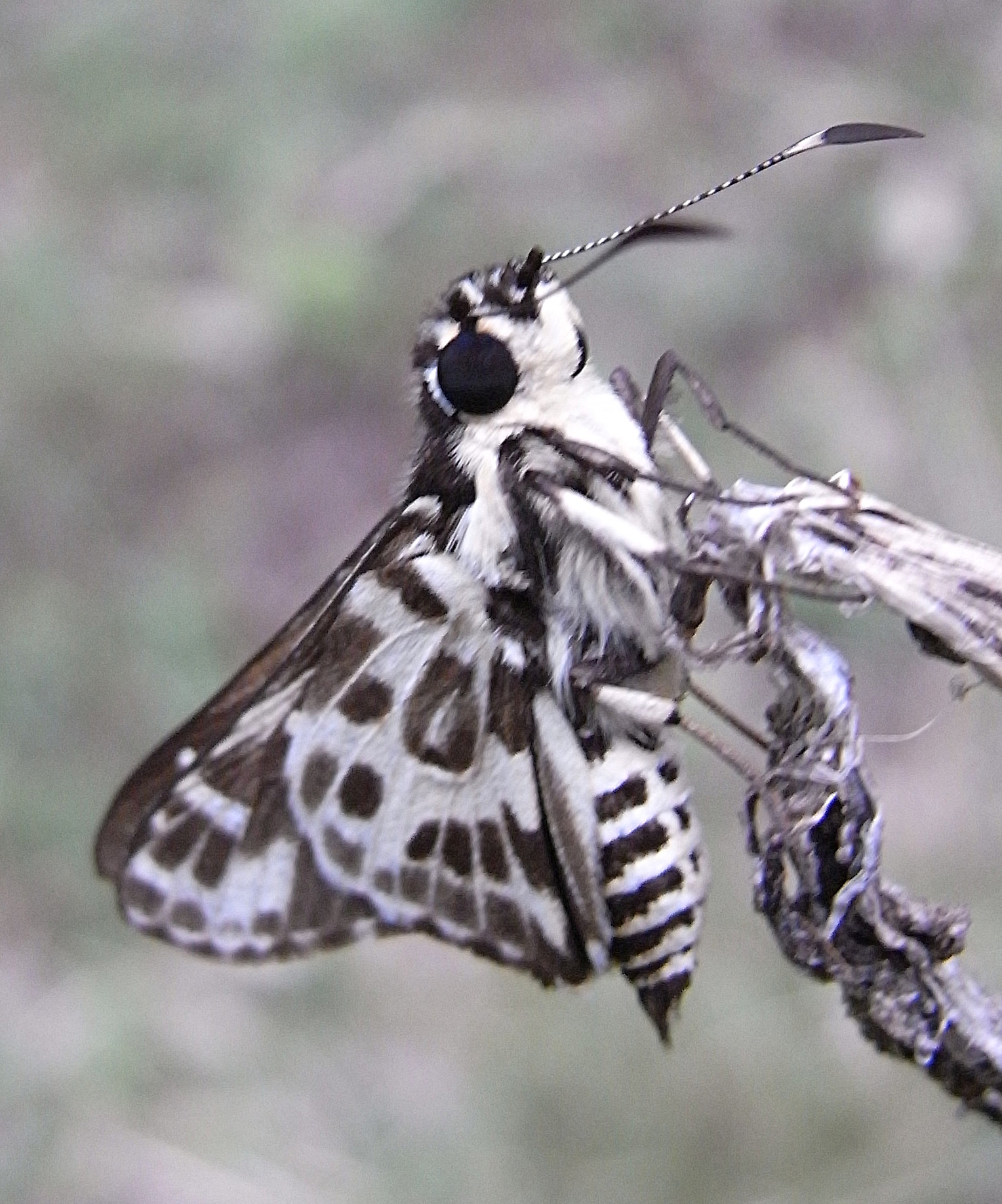

The wingspan is about 40 mm.

The larvae feed on various Carex and Gahnia species, including Carex brunnea, Carex longebrachiata, Gahnia aspera, Gahnia clarkei, Gahnia erythrocarpa, Gahnia grandis, Gahnia melanocarpa, Gahnia radula and Gahnia sieberiana.

== Subspecies ==
- Hesperilla ornata monotherm (Lower, 1907) (Queensland)
- Hesperilla ornata ornata (Leach, 1814) - spotted skipper (New South Wales, Queensland, Victoria)
