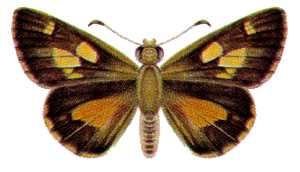

Scientific classification
- Kingdom: Animalia
- Phylum: Arthropoda
- Class: Insecta
- Order: Lepidoptera
- Family: Hesperiidae
- Genus: Hesperilla
- Species: H. idothea

Binomial name
- Hesperilla idothea (Miskin, 1889)

Synonyms
- Trapezites idothea Miskin, 1889; Telesto dispar Kirby, 1893; Hesperilla clara Waterhouse, 1932

= Hesperilla idothea =

Species of butterfly

Hesperilla idothea, commonly known as the flame sedge-skipper, is a species of butterfly in the family Hesperiidae. It is found in the Australian states of New South Wales, Queensland, South Australia and Victoria.

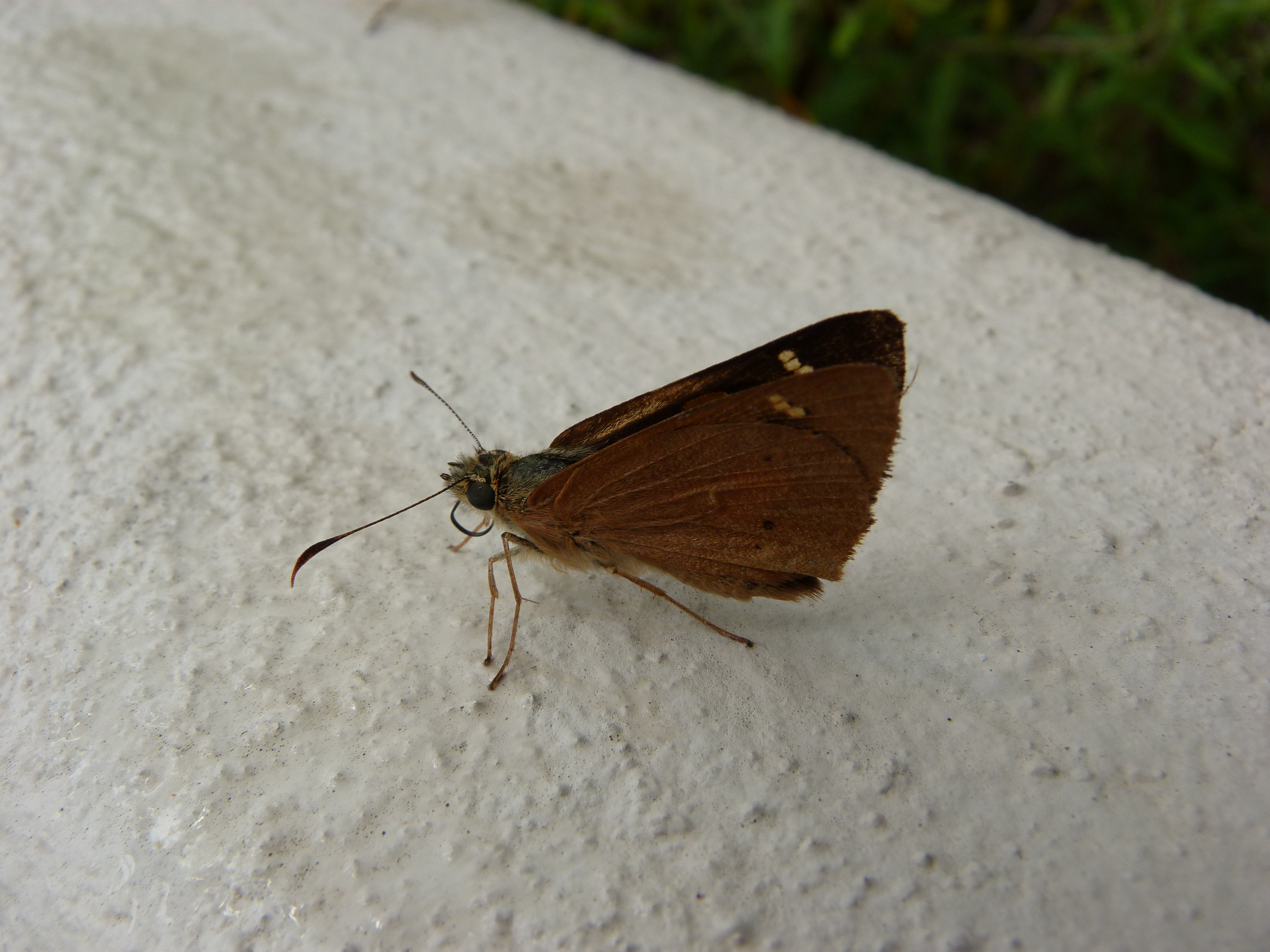

The wingspan is about 40 mm.

The larvae feed on various sword grass species, including Gahnia aspera, Gahnia clarkei, Gahnia grandis, Gahnia melanocarpa, Gahnia radula, Gahnia sieberiana, Gahnia subaequiglumis and Gahnia trifida.

== Subspecies ==
- Hesperilla idothea clara Waterhouse, 1932 (South Australia)
- Hesperilla idothea idothea (Miskin, 1889) (New South Wales, Queensland, South Australia, Victoria)
