= List of butterflies of Tasmania =

Tasmania is located south of the mainland of Australia, separated from the state of Victoria by the 240 km wide Bass Strait. Although Tasmania shares most of its fauna with the southern parts of Australia or Australia as a whole, Tasmania's isolation along with its wetter, cooler and cloudier weather caused the evolution of several endemic Tasmanian species and subspecies, butterflies included.

There are thirty-nine species of butterflies found in Tasmania. They are grouped primarily as: skippers, blues, browns, swallowtails and the introduced whites.

== Papilionidae ==
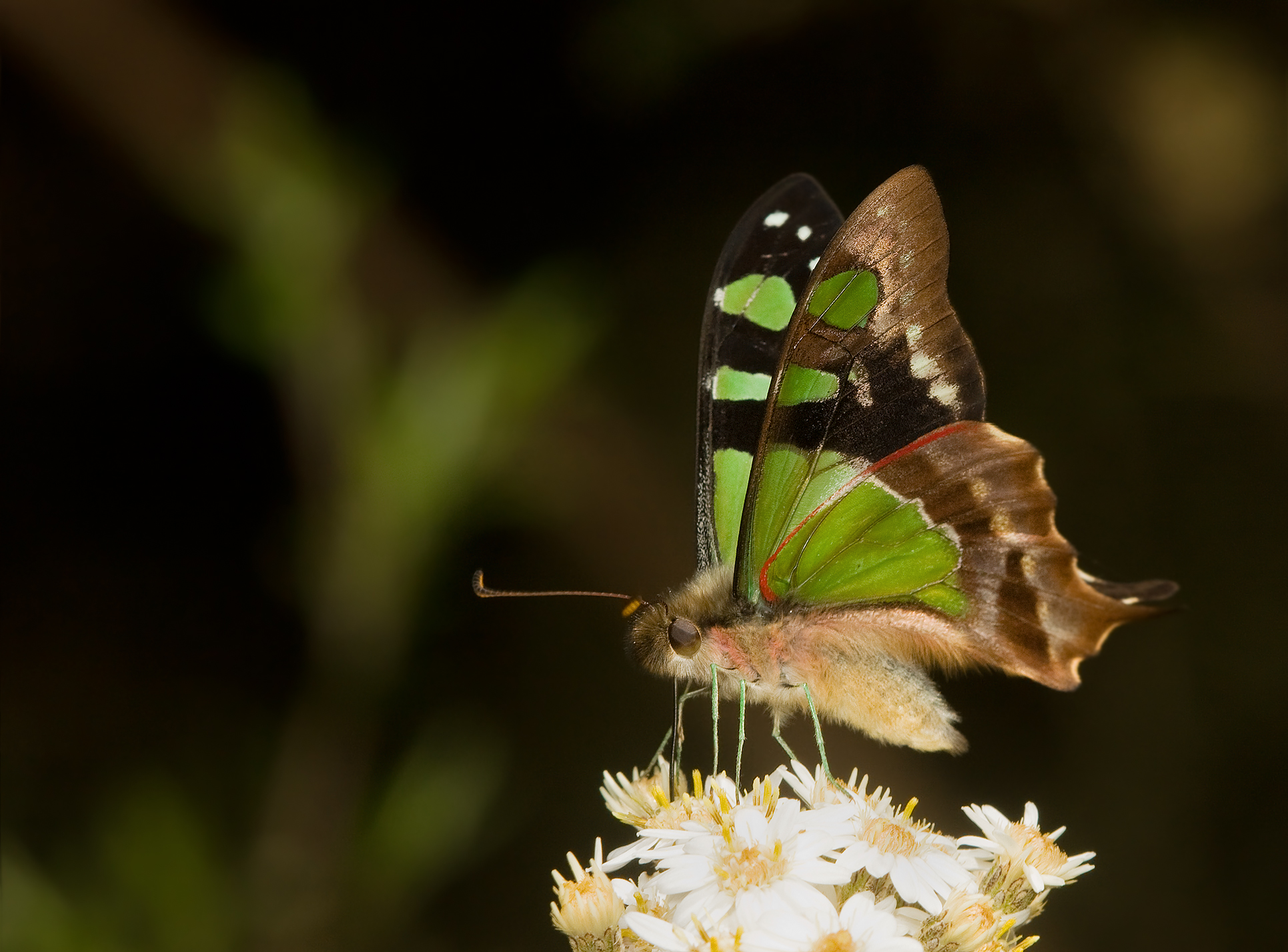
Macleay's swallowtail (Graphium macleayanus), Franklin - Gordon Wild Rivers National Park, Tasmania, Australia

family: Papilionidae (swallowtails) — 1 species

=== Papilioninae ===
genus: Graphium

- Macleay's swallowtail, Graphium macleayanus (moggana)

== Pieridae ==
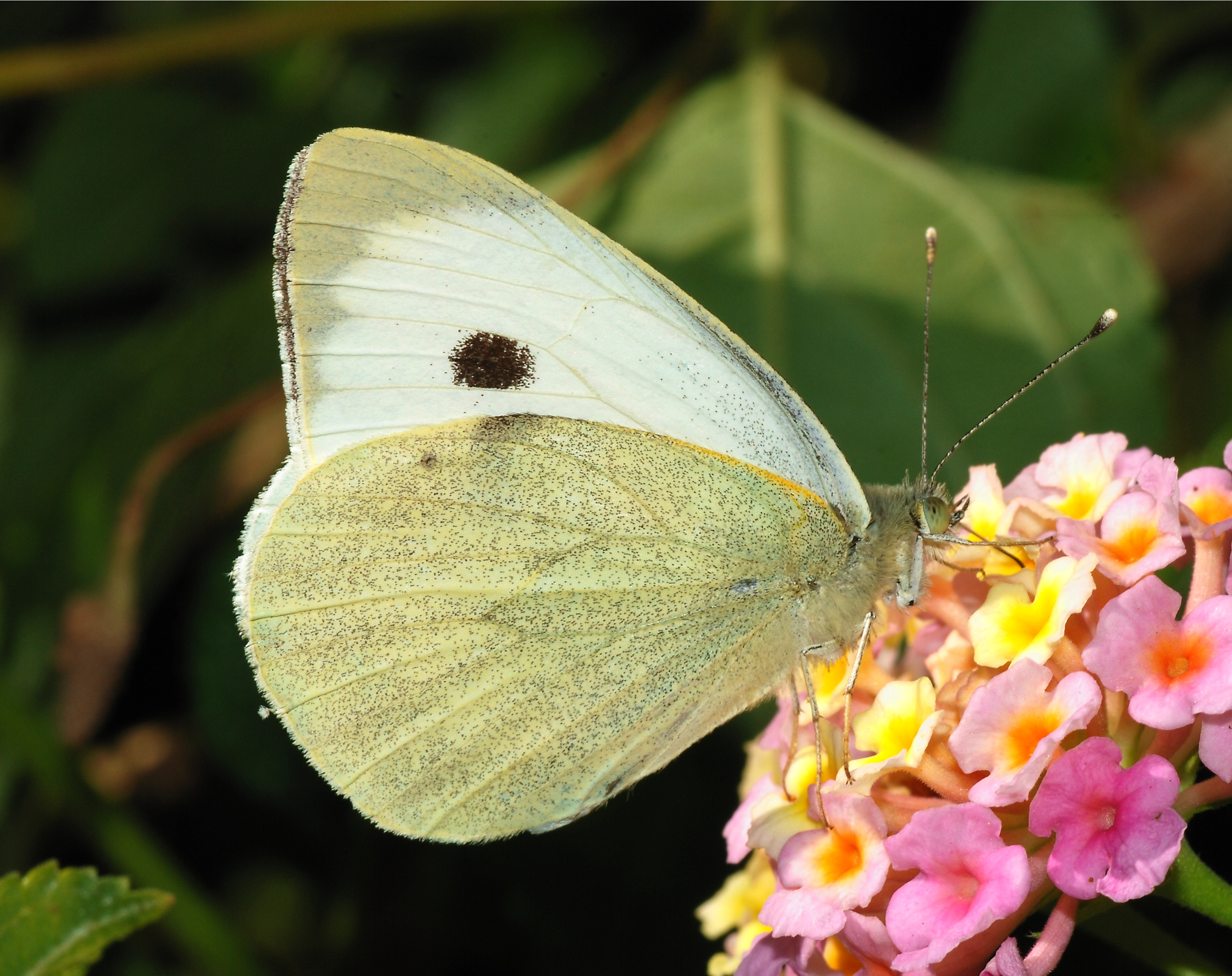
Small white

family: Pieridae (whites and yellows) — 4 species

=== Coliadinae ===
genus: Eurema

- Small grass yellow, Eurema smilax

=== Pierinae ===
genus: Appias

- Albatross butterfly, Appias paulina

genus: Anaphaeis

- Caper white, Anaphaeis java

genus: Pieris

- Small white, Pieris rapae

== Lycaenidae ==
family: Lycaenidae (gossamer-winged blues and coppers) — 9 species

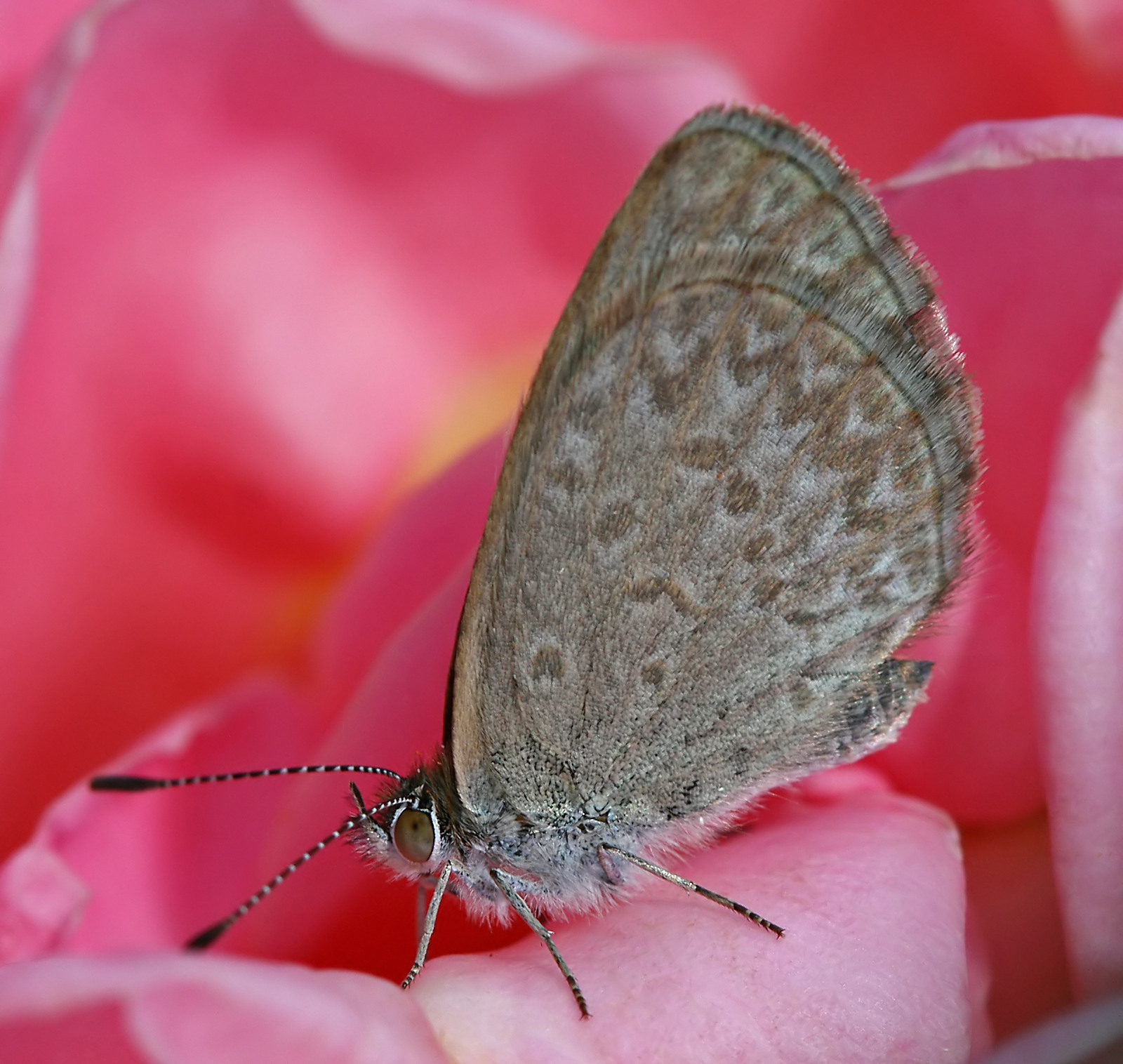
Zizina labradus, the common grass blue perched on a rose

=== Polyommatinae ===
genus: Candalides

- Blotched blue, Candalides acasta

genus: Lampides

- Pea blue, Lampides boeticus

genus: Neolucia

- Fringed blue, Neolucia agricola
- Mountain blue, Neolucia hobartensis
- Mathew's blue, Neolucia mathewi

genus: Theclinesthes

- Chequered blue, Theclinesthes serpentata

genus: Zizina

- Common grass blue, Zizina labradus

=== Theclinae ===
genus: Paralucia

- Bright copper, Paralucia aurifera

genus: Pseudalmenus

- Tasmanian hairstreak, Pseudalmenus chlorinda (chlorinda)

== Nymphalidae ==
family: Nymphalidae (brush– or four-footed) — 14 species

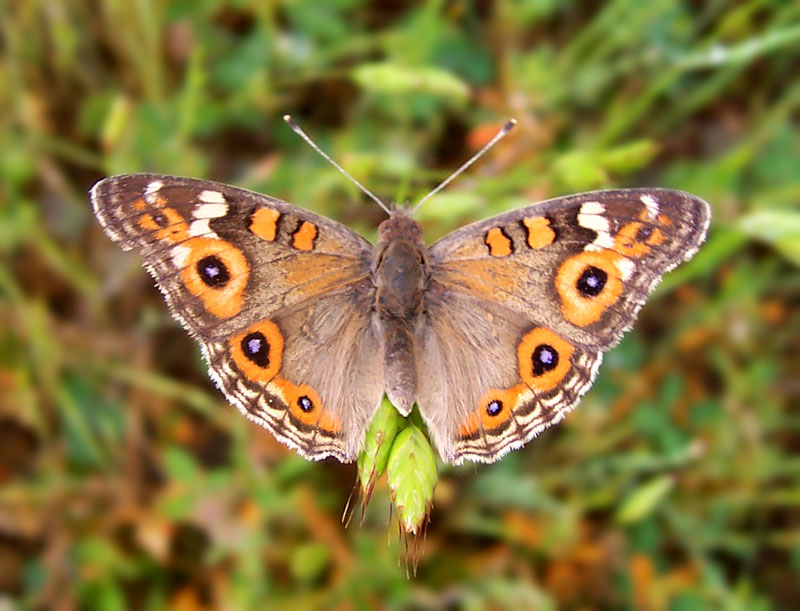
Junonia villida, the meadow argus

=== Danainae ===
genus: Danaus

- Lesser wanderer butterfly, Danaus chrysippus
- Wanderer butterfly, Danaus plexippus

=== Nymphalinae ===
genus: Junonia

- Meadow argus, Junonia villida

genus: Vanessa

- Yellow admiral, Vanessa itea
- Australian painted lady, Vanessa kershawi

=== Satyrinae ===
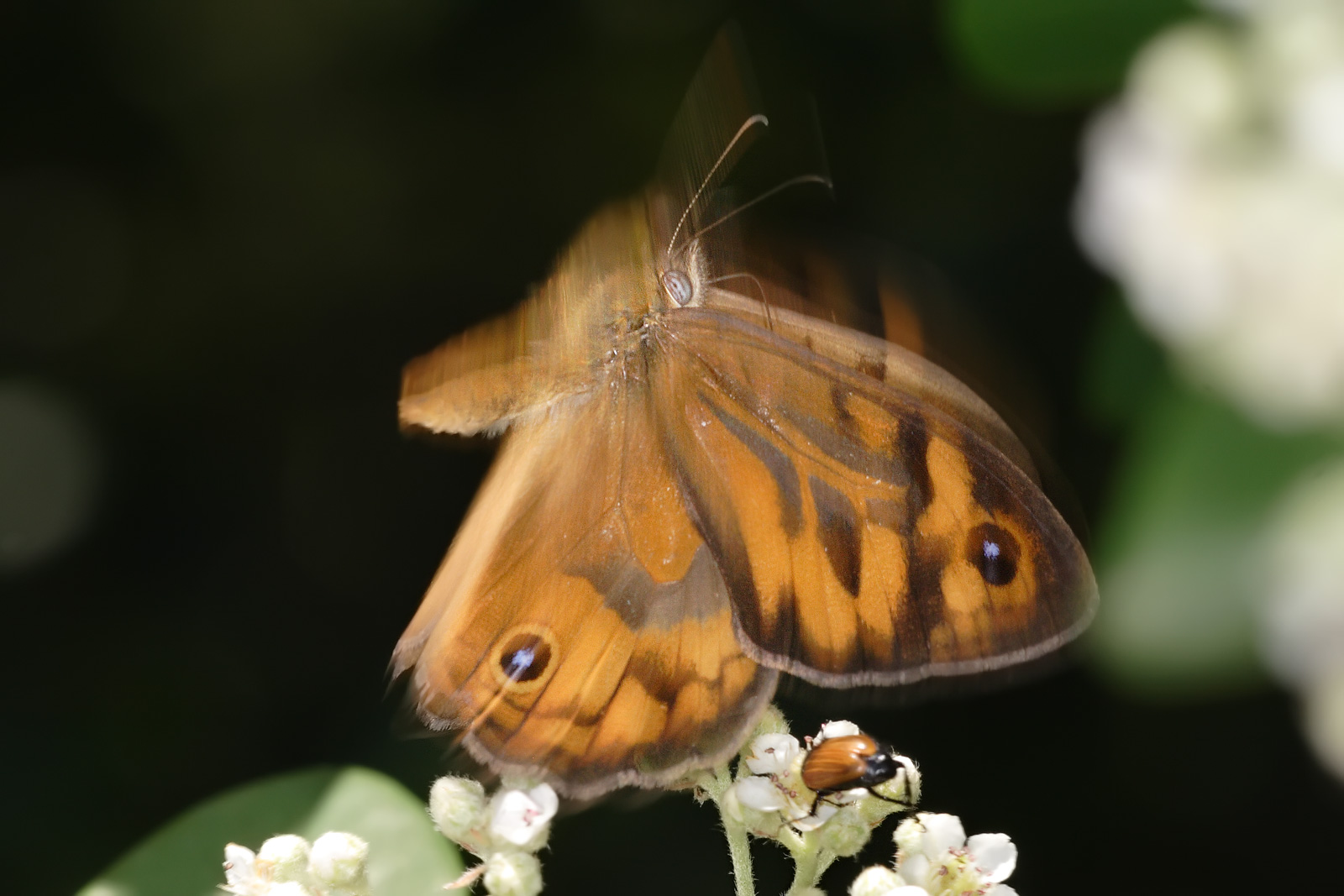
Common brown

genus: Argynnina

- Tasmanian brown, Argynnina hobartia

genus: Geitoneura

- Klug's xenica, Geitoneura klugii

genus: Heteronympha

- Bright-eyed brown, Heteronympha cordace
- Common brown, Heteronympha merope
- Shouldered brown, Heteronympha penelope

genus: Nesoxenica

- Leprea brown, Nesoxenica leprea

genus: Oreixenica

- Common silver xenica, Oreixenica lathoniella
- Orichora brown, Oreixenica orichora
- Ptunarra brown, Oreixenica ptunarra

== Hesperiidae ==
family: Hesperiidae (skippers) — 11 species

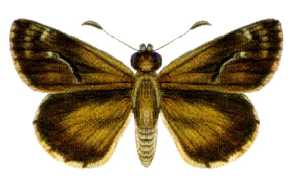
Anisynta dominula

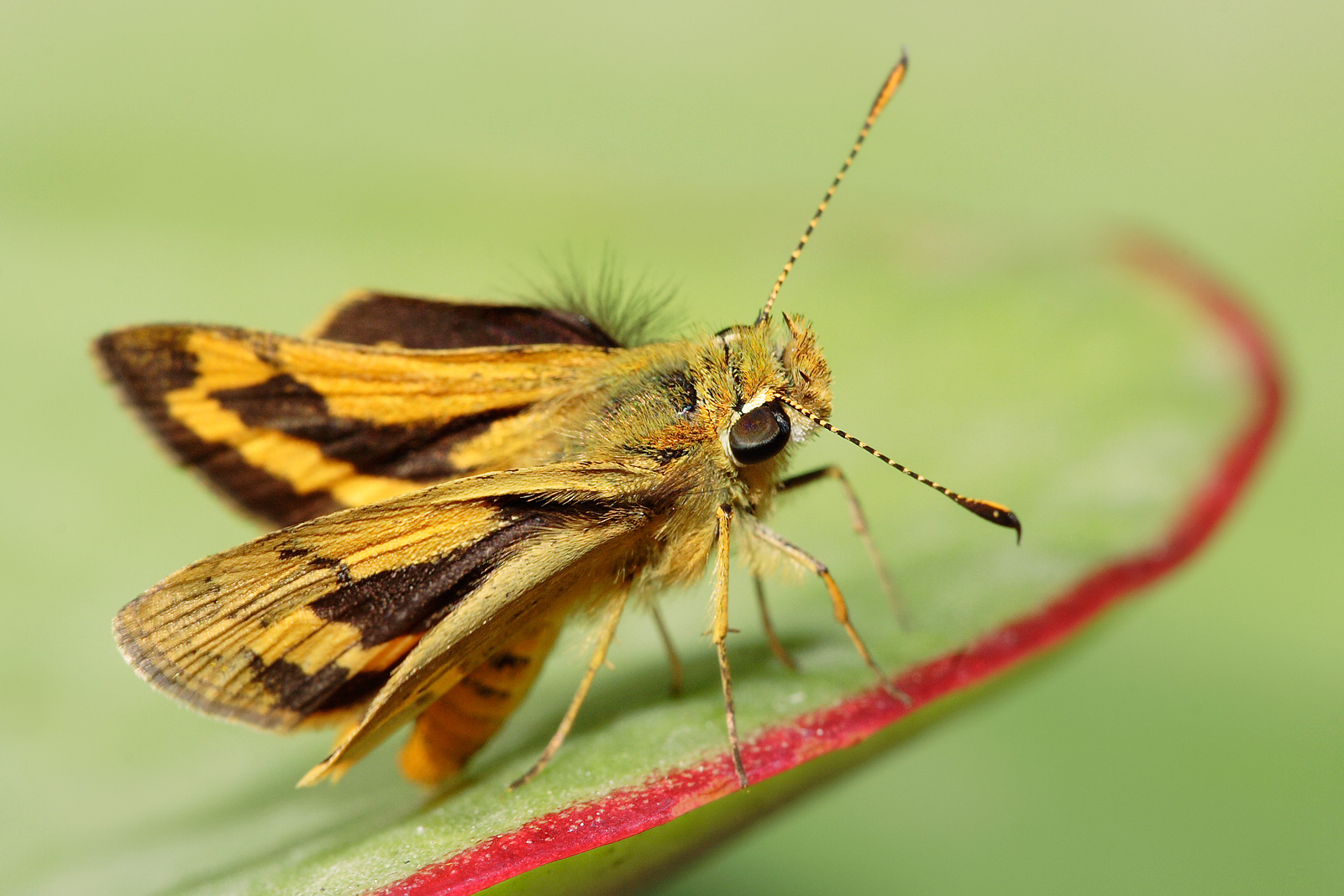
Yellow-banded dart

genus: Anisynta

- Dominula skipper Anisynta dominula

genus: Antipodia

- Antipodia skipper Antipodia chaostola

genus: Hesperilla

- Chrysotricha skipper Hesperilla chrysotricha
- Donnysa skipper Hesperilla donnysa
- Flame skipper Hesperilla idothea
- Master's skipper Hesperilla mastersi

genus: Ocybadistes

- Yellow-banded dart Ocybadistes walkeri

genus: Oreisplanus

- Marrawah skipper or alpine skipper Oreisplanus munionga

genus: Pasma

- Tasmanica skipper or two-spotted grass-skipper Pasma tasmanicus

genus: Taractrocera

- White grassdart Taractrocera papyria

genus: Trapezites

- Rare white-spot skipper Trapezites lutea

== See also ==
- List of butterflies of Australia
- List of butterflies of Victoria
