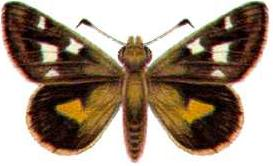

Scientific classification
- Kingdom: Animalia
- Phylum: Arthropoda
- Class: Insecta
- Order: Lepidoptera
- Family: Hesperiidae
- Genus: Hesperilla
- Species: H. chrysotricha

Binomial name
- Hesperilla chrysotricha (Meyrick & Lower, 1902)

Synonyms
- Telesto chrysotricha Meyrick & Lower, 1902; Telesto cyclospila Meyrick & Lower, 1902; Hesperilla leucospila Waterhouse, 1927; Hesperilla plebeia Waterhouse, 1927; Hesperilla leucosia Waterhouse, 1938; Hesperilla lunawanna Couchman, 1949; Hesperilla naua Couchman, 1949

= Hesperilla chrysotricha =

Species of butterfly

Hesperilla chrysotricha, also known as the chrysotricha skipper or goldenhaired sedge-skipper, is a species of butterfly in the family Hesperiidae. It is found in the Australian states of Victoria, Tasmania, South Australia and Western Australia.

The wingspan is about 35 mm for males. Females are slightly larger.

The larvae feed on various sword grasses, including Gahnia decomposita, Gahnia deusta, Gahnia filum, Gahnia microstachya, Gahnia radula, Gahnia sieberiana and Gahnia trifida.

== Subspecies ==
- Hesperilla chrysotricha chrysotricha (Western Australia)
- Hesperilla chrysotricha cyclospila (South Australia, Tasmania, Victoria)
  - Synonyms:
  - Hesperilla chrysotricha leucospila Waterhouse, 1927
  - Hesperilla chrysotricha plebeia Waterhouse, 1927
  - Hesperilla chrysotricha leucosia Waterhouse, 1938
  - Hesperilla chrysotricha lunawanna Couchman, 1949
  - Hesperilla chrysotricha naua Couchman, 1949
