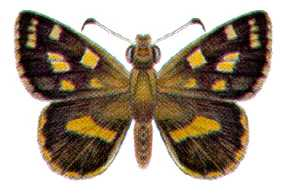

Scientific classification
- Kingdom: Animalia
- Phylum: Arthropoda
- Class: Insecta
- Order: Lepidoptera
- Family: Hesperiidae
- Genus: Hesperilla
- Species: H. crypsargyra

Binomial name
- Hesperilla crypsargyra (Meyrick, 1888)

Synonyms
- Telesto crypsargyra Meyrick, 1888; Hesperilla hopsoni Waterhouse, 1927; Hesperilla lesouefi Tindale, 1953

= Hesperilla crypsargyra =

Species of butterfly

Hesperilla crypsargyra, also known as the silvered skipper or silver hedge-skipper, is a species of butterfly in the family Hesperiidae. It is found in the Australian states of New South Wales, Queensland and Victoria.

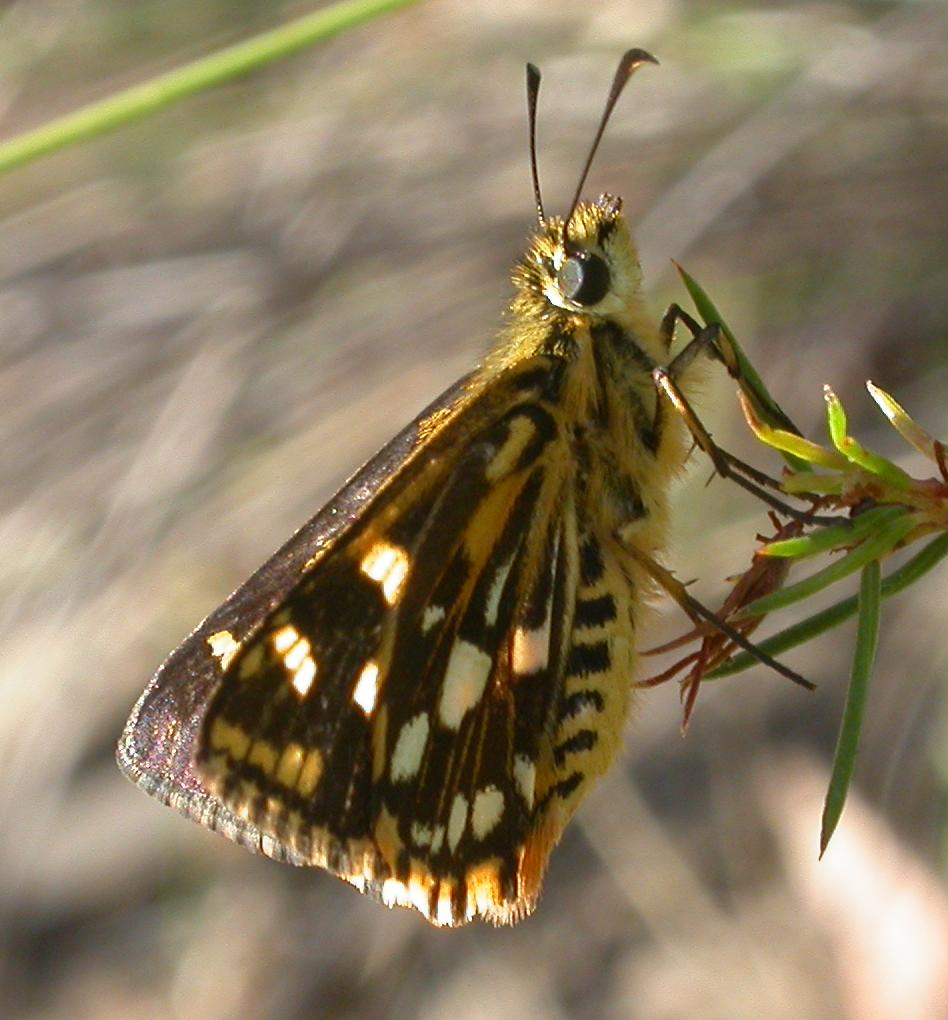

The wingspan is about 20 mm.

The larvae feed on various sword grasses, including Gahnia sieberiana, Gahnia grandis and Gahnia microstachya.

== Subspecies ==
- Hesperilla crypsargyra crypsargyra (Meyrick, 1888) (New South Wales, Victoria)
- Hesperilla crypsargyra hopsoni Waterhouse, 1927 (New South Wales, Queensland)
