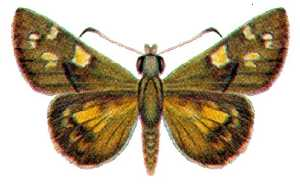

Scientific classification
- Kingdom: Animalia
- Phylum: Arthropoda
- Class: Insecta
- Order: Lepidoptera
- Family: Hesperiidae
- Genus: Antipodia
- Species: A. chaostola

Binomial name
- Antipodia chaostola Meyrick, 1888

Synonyms
- Telesto chaostola; Hesperilla chares; Hesperilla leucophaea; Antipodia chaostola

= Antipodia chaostola =

Chaostola skipper

Species of butterfly

Antipodia chaostola, the chaostola skipper, is a species of butterfly of the family Hesperiidae. It is found in Australia along the coast of Victoria, New South Wales and Tasmania.

The wingspan is about 30 mm.

The larvae feed on Cyperaceae species, including Gahnia filifolia, Gahnia grandis, Gahnia microstachya, Gahnia radula and Gahnia sieberiana.

== Subspecies ==
- Antipodia chaostola chaostola (New South Wales)
- Antipodia chaostola chares (Victoria)
- Antipodia chaostola leucophaea (Tasmania)
