= Synechocera =

Scientific classification
- Kingdom: Animalia
- Phylum: Arthropoda
- Clade: Pancrustacea
- Class: Insecta
- Order: Coleoptera
- Suborder: Polyphaga
- Infraorder: Elateriformia
- Family: Buprestidae
- Genus: Synechocera; Deyrolle, 1864

Genus of beetles

Synechocera is a genus of beetles in the family Buprestidae, the jewel beetles. They are native to Australia.

These beetles are elongated and flattened in shape, measuring under one centimeter in length. Their flattened shape makes them distinct from related genera and might be an adaptation for living between densely arranged leaves on plants. They are usually black in color, but some species are coppery brown or occasionally blue.

The larvae of S. tasmanica have been observed tunneling into the stems of sedges (genus Gahnia). They then "pack their bright yellow frass into the central hollow portion" of the stems and pupate there.

Species include:

- Synechocera albohirta (Carter, 1921)
- Synechocera bicolor (Bellamy, 1987)
- Synechocera brooksi (Bellamy, 1987)
- Synechocera burnsi (Bellamy, 1987)
- Synechocera cynaeipennis (Carter, 1924)
- Synechocera deplana (Fabricius, 1801)
- Synechocera elongata (Thomson, 1879)
- Synechocera parvipennis (Bellamy, 1987)
- Synechocera queenslandica (Bellamy, 1987)
- Synechocera setosa (Carter, 1924)
