= Gahnia sinuosa =

Scientific classification
- Kingdom: Plantae
- Clade: Tracheophytes
- Clade: Angiosperms
- Clade: Monocots
- Clade: Commelinids
- Order: Poales
- Family: Cyperaceae
- Genus: Gahnia
- Species: G. sinuosa

Binomial name
- Gahnia sinuosa J.Raynal, 1975

Species of plant

Gahnia sinuosa is a tussock-forming perennial in the family Cyperaceae, that is native to New Caledonia.
