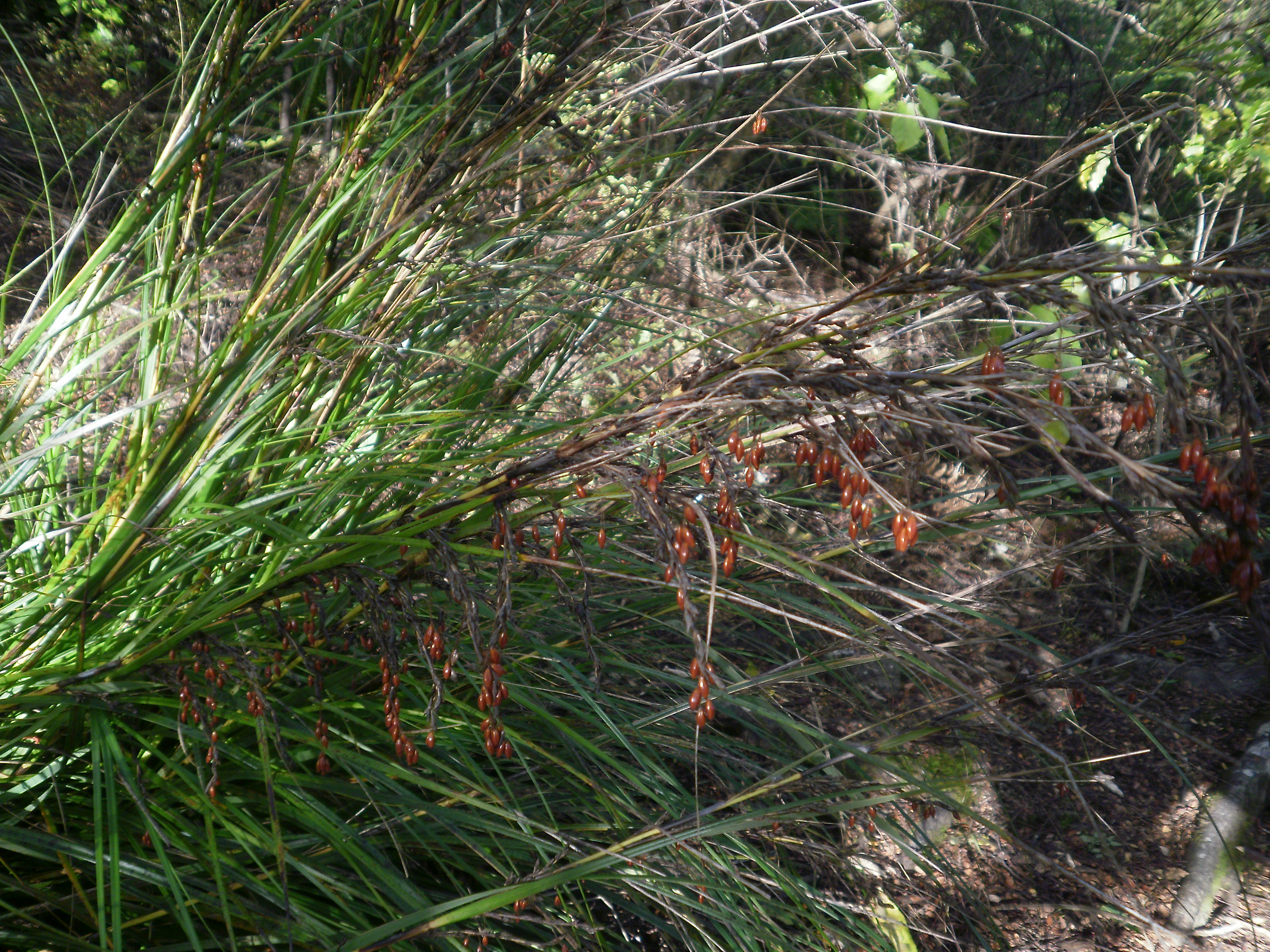

Scientific classification
- Kingdom: Plantae
- Clade: Tracheophytes
- Clade: Angiosperms
- Clade: Monocots
- Clade: Commelinids
- Order: Poales
- Family: Cyperaceae
- Genus: Gahnia
- Species: G. pauciflora

Binomial name
- Gahnia pauciflora Kirk

= Gahnia pauciflora =

Sedge native to New Zealand

Gahnia pauciflora, commonly called cutting sedge, is a native sedge of New Zealand. It is found throughout the North Island and top of the South Island of New Zealand.

The specific epithet pauciflora is Latin for 'few-flowered'.

G. pauciflora is a host and food plant for the rare forest ringlet butterfly.
