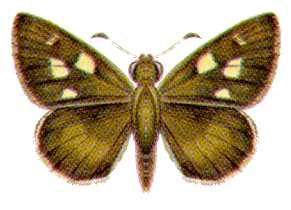

Scientific classification
- Kingdom: Animalia
- Phylum: Arthropoda
- Class: Insecta
- Order: Lepidoptera
- Family: Hesperiidae
- Genus: Hesperilla
- Species: H. malindeva

Binomial name
- Hesperilla malindeva Lower, 1911

Synonyms
- Hesperilla dagoomba Johnson & Valentine, 1994

= Hesperilla malindeva =

Species of insect

Hesperilla malindeva, commonly known as the malindeva skipper or two-spotted sedge-skipper, is a species of butterfly in the family Hesperiidae. It is found in the Australian states of New South Wales and Queensland.

The wingspan is about 30 mm. The species common name refers to two dark greenish brown spots on the hindwing underside, although these markings are sometimes absent. Males are often observed perching on shrubs and dead branches around 30 m above the ground.

The larvae feed on Gahnia aspera.
