= Gahnia javanica =

Scientific classification
- Kingdom: Plantae
- Clade: Tracheophytes
- Clade: Angiosperms
- Clade: Monocots
- Clade: Commelinids
- Order: Poales
- Family: Cyperaceae
- Genus: Gahnia
- Species: G. javanica

Binomial name
- Gahnia javanica Moritizi, 1846

Species of plant

Gahnia javanica is a tussock-forming perennial in the family Cyperaceae, that is native to parts of Asia and Melanesia.
