= Gahnia beecheyi =

Scientific classification
- Kingdom: Plantae
- Clade: Tracheophytes
- Clade: Angiosperms
- Clade: Monocots
- Clade: Commelinids
- Order: Poales
- Family: Cyperaceae
- Genus: Gahnia
- Species: G. beecheyi

Binomial name
- Gahnia beecheyi H.Mann (1867)

Synonyms
- Homotypic Synonyms: Mariscus beecheyi (H.Mann) Kuntze; Heterotypic Synonyms: Gahnia leptostachya Boeckeler; Gahnia mannii Hillebr.; Lampocarya leptostachya Schrad. ex Boeckeler; Mariscus mannii (Hillebr.) Kuntze; Mariscus mucronatus Kuntze

Species of plant

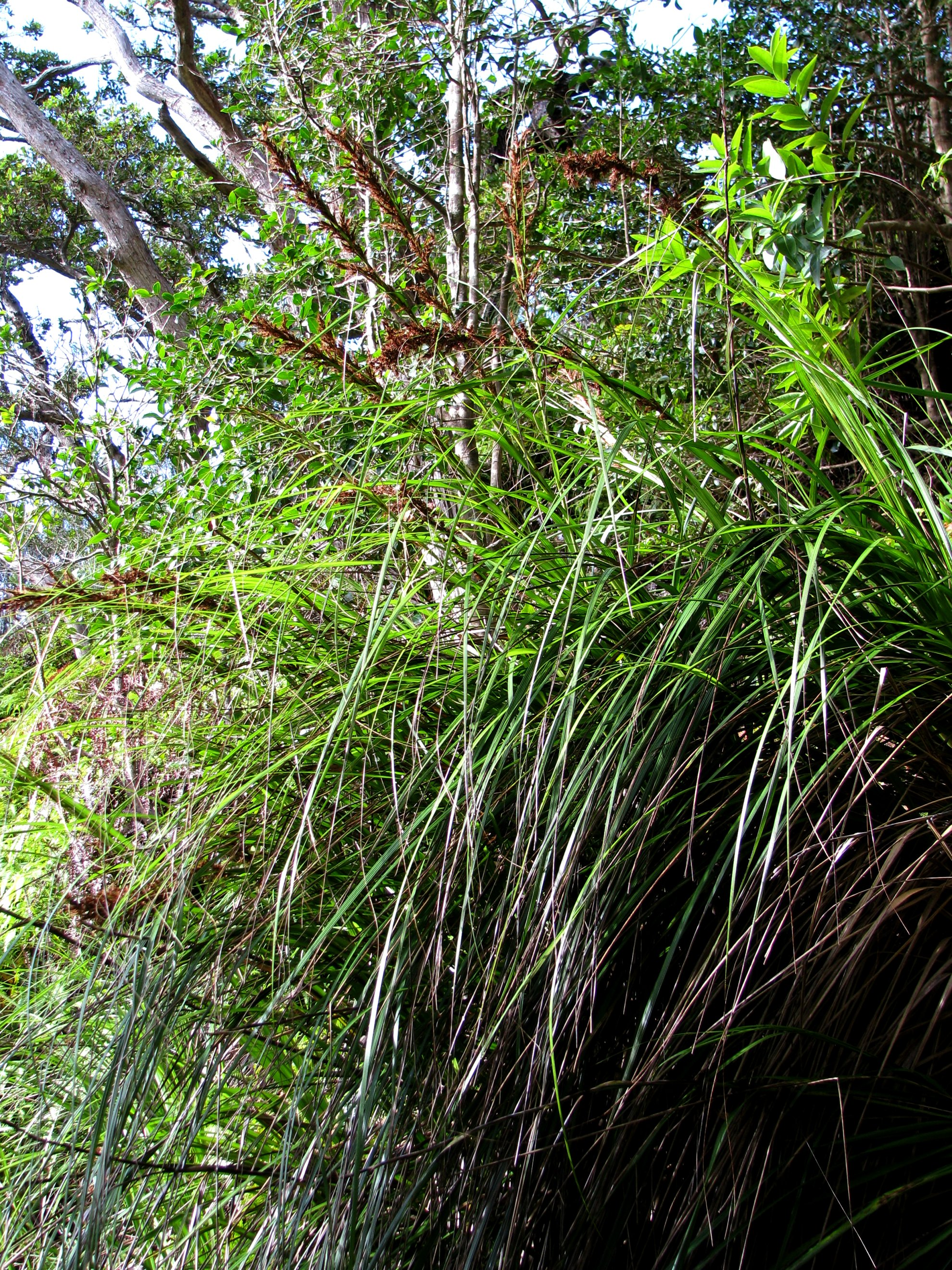

Gahnia beecheyi is a species of tussock-forming perennial in the family Cyperaceae. It is native to parts of Hawaii.
