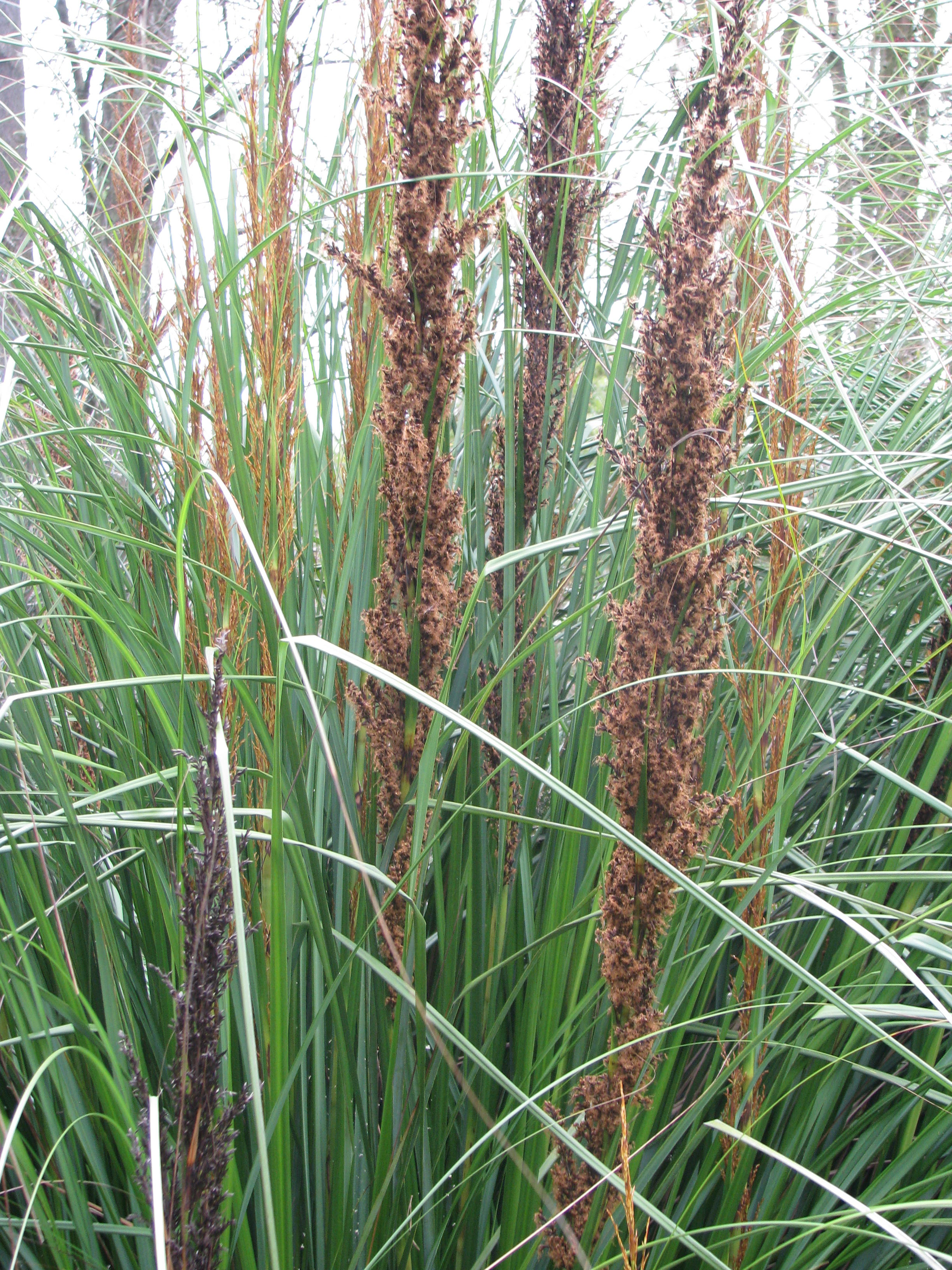

Scientific classification
- Kingdom: Plantae
- Clade: Tracheophytes
- Clade: Angiosperms
- Clade: Monocots
- Clade: Commelinids
- Order: Poales
- Family: Cyperaceae
- Genus: Gahnia
- Species: G. australis

Binomial name
- Gahnia australis (Nees) K.L.Wilson, 1980

= Gahnia australis =

Species of plant

Gahnia australis is a tussock-forming perennial in the family Cyperaceae, that is native to southern western parts of Western Australia.
