= Gahnia marquisensis =

Scientific classification
- Kingdom: Plantae
- Clade: Tracheophytes
- Clade: Angiosperms
- Clade: Monocots
- Clade: Commelinids
- Order: Poales
- Family: Cyperaceae
- Genus: Gahnia
- Species: G. marquisensis

Binomial name
- Gahnia marquisensis F.Br., 1931

Species of plant

Gahnia marquisensis is a tussock-forming perennial in the family Cyperaceae, that is native to parts of the Marquesas Islands.
