= Gahnia ancistrophylla =

Scientific classification
- Kingdom: Plantae
- Clade: Tracheophytes
- Clade: Angiosperms
- Clade: Monocots
- Clade: Commelinids
- Order: Poales
- Family: Cyperaceae
- Genus: Gahnia
- Species: G. ancistrophylla

Binomial name
- Gahnia ancistrophylla Benth., 1878

Species of plant

Gahnia ancistrophylla, also known as hooked-leaf saw sedge, is a tussock-forming perennial in the family Cyperaceae, that is native to southern parts of Western Australia, South Australia and Victoria.
