= Gahnia vitiensis =

Scientific classification
- Kingdom: Plantae
- Clade: Embryophytes
- Clade: Tracheophytes
- Clade: Angiosperms
- Clade: Monocots
- Clade: Commelinids
- Order: Poales
- Family: Cyperaceae
- Genus: Gahnia
- Species: G. vitiensis

Binomial name
- Gahnia vitiensis Rendle (1909)

Species of plant

Gahnia vitiensis is a tussock-forming perennial in the family Cyperaceae, that is native to Fiji, the Samoan Islands, and the Hawaiian Islands.

Two subspecies are accepted.

- Gahnia vitiensis subsp. kauaiensis (Benl) T.Koyama (synonym Gahnia kauaiensis Benl) – Hawaiian Islands (Kauai). The IUCN Red List assesses this subspecies as Endangered.
- Gahnia vitiensis subsp. vitiensis – Fiji and the Samoan Islands
