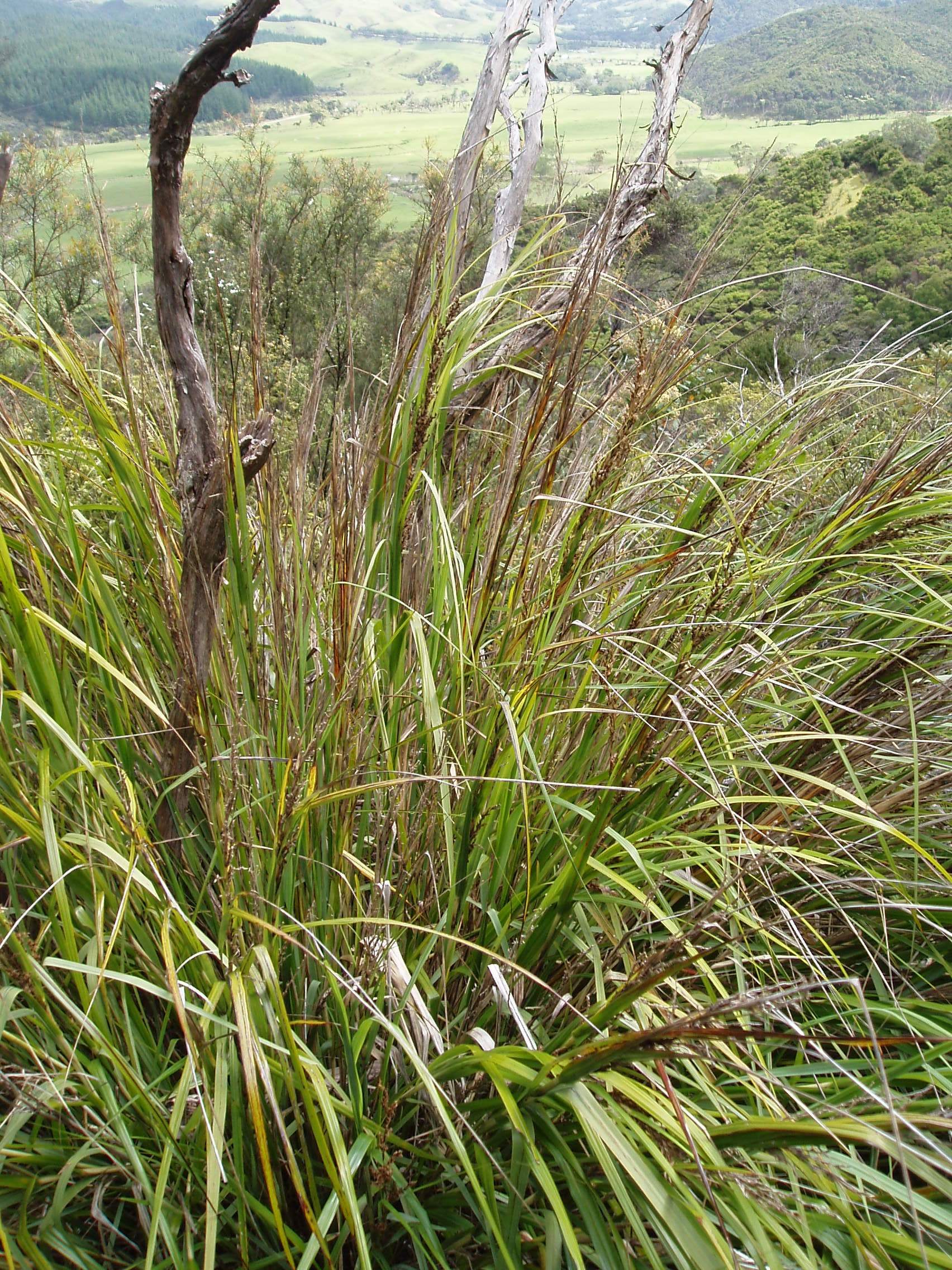

Scientific classification
- Kingdom: Plantae
- Clade: Tracheophytes
- Clade: Angiosperms
- Clade: Monocots
- Clade: Commelinids
- Order: Poales
- Family: Cyperaceae
- Genus: Gahnia
- Species: G. lacera

Binomial name
- Gahnia lacera (R.Lesson ex A.Rich.) Steud., 1855

= Gahnia lacera =

Species of plant

Gahnia lacera, or toetoe kiwi, is a tussock-forming perennial in the family Cyperaceae, that is native to parts of the North Island of New Zealand.
