= Gahnia hystrix =

Scientific classification
- Kingdom: Plantae
- Clade: Tracheophytes
- Clade: Angiosperms
- Clade: Monocots
- Clade: Commelinids
- Order: Poales
- Family: Cyperaceae
- Genus: Gahnia
- Species: G. hystrix

Binomial name
- Gahnia hystrix J.M.Black, 1927

Species of plant

Gahnia hystrix is a tussock-forming perennial in the family Cyperaceae, that is native to parts of Kangaroo Island.
