= Gahnia insignis =

Scientific classification
- Kingdom: Plantae
- Clade: Tracheophytes
- Clade: Angiosperms
- Clade: Monocots
- Clade: Commelinids
- Order: Poales
- Family: Cyperaceae
- Genus: Gahnia
- Species: G. insignis

Binomial name
- Gahnia insignis S.T.Blake, 1957

Species of plant

Gahnia insignis is a tussock-forming perennial in the family Cyperaceae, that is native to eastern parts of Australia from south eastern Queensland to north eastern New South Wales.
