= Gahnia sclerioides =

Scientific classification
- Kingdom: Plantae
- Clade: Tracheophytes
- Clade: Angiosperms
- Clade: Monocots
- Clade: Commelinids
- Order: Poales
- Family: Cyperaceae
- Genus: Gahnia
- Species: G. sclerioides

Binomial name
- Gahnia sclerioides K.L.Wilson, 1997

Species of plant

Gahnia sclerioides is a tussock-forming perennial in the family Cyperaceae, that is native to south western parts of Western Australia.
