= Gahnia howeana =

Scientific classification
- Kingdom: Plantae
- Clade: Tracheophytes
- Clade: Angiosperms
- Clade: Monocots
- Clade: Commelinids
- Order: Poales
- Family: Cyperaceae
- Genus: Gahnia
- Species: G. howeana

Binomial name
- Gahnia howeana R.O.Gardner (1997)

Species of grass-like plant

Gahnia howeana is a flowering plant in the sedge family. The specific epithet refers to Lord Howe Island, where it is found. It was formerly lumped with Gahnia xanthocarpa, which is now considered to be endemic to New Zealand.

== Description ==
It is a strong, tussocky perennial sedge with stout, smooth culms, growing to 1–2 m in height. The leaves are as long as the culms and about 1 cm wide at the base. It has a drooping, paniculate inflorescence, 30–40 cm in length.

== Distribution and habitat ==
The sedge is endemic to Australia’s subtropical Lord Howe Island in the Tasman Sea. It occurs in moist areas within low forest on the rocky slopes and summits of Mounts Lidgbird and Gower at the southern end of the island.
