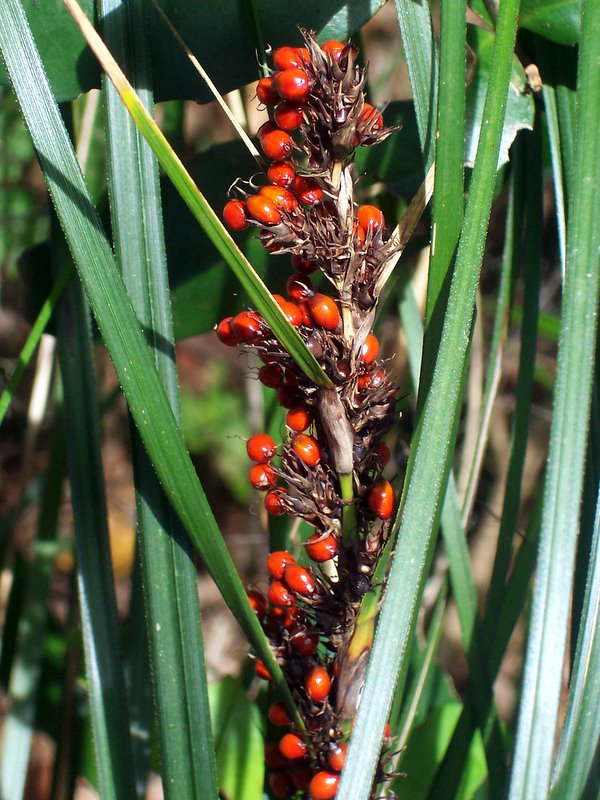

Scientific classification
- Kingdom: Plantae
- Clade: Tracheophytes
- Clade: Angiosperms
- Clade: Monocots
- Clade: Commelinids
- Order: Poales
- Family: Cyperaceae
- Genus: Gahnia
- Species: G. aspera

Binomial name
- Gahnia aspera (R.Br.) Spreng.

Synonyms
- Cladium asperum (R.Br.) F.Muell.; Lampocarya aspera R.Br.; Mariscus asper (R.Br.) Kuntze

= Gahnia aspera =

Rough saw sedge

Species of grass-like plant

Gahnia aspera known as the rough saw-sedge or round sawsedge is a tussock forming perennial plant, often seen in moist situations. The long strap like leaves grow to 80 cm long.

Originally described by botanist Robert Brown as Lampocarya aspera in his 1810 work Prodromus Florae Novae Hollandiae, it was placed in its current genus by German botanist Curt Polycarp Joachim Sprengel in 1825. Its specific name aspera is the Latin adjective asper "rough".

Gahnia aspera grows as a strappy tussock 50–100 cm (20–39 in) high by 50–150 cm (20–59 in) across, with leaves to 80 cm (31 in) long. The underside of the leaves and leaf edges are sharp and can easily cut human skin. The creamy flowers grow in spikes from the centre of the plant and appear from October to January. They are followed by shiny red or red-brown round nuts, which measure 4.5 to 6.0 mm long, 2.5 to 4.0 mm in diameter.

Two subspecies are accepted.

- Gahnia aspera subsp. aspera – Cook Islands, Fiji, Maluku Islands, New Caledonia, New Guinea, New South Wales, Ogasawara Islands, Queensland, Society Islands, Tubuai Islands, Vanuatu, and Wallis and Futuna
- Gahnia aspera subsp. globosa (H.Mann) J.Kern – Hawaiian Islands (Oahu)

It is found in a variety of situations, from rainforest to drier inland areas such as Rankins Springs and the Pilliga Scrub district in New South Wales. Also seen in Queensland, Malaysia, New Guinea and islands in the Pacific.

The caterpillars of the spotted sedge-skipper (Hesperilla ornata), two-spotted sedge-skipper (Hesperilla malindeva), and flame sedge-skipper (Hesperilla idothea) feed on the leaves.

Gahnia aspera is relatively easy to grow and benefits from a moist position in the garden for best foliage. It grows in semi-shade or some sun and has horticultural appeal in its foliage and nuts, but is not widely grown as propagation by seed is difficult. It also serves as shelter in the garden for small birds such as the superb fairywren.

The seeds were used by Aboriginal Australians to make a kind of flour.
