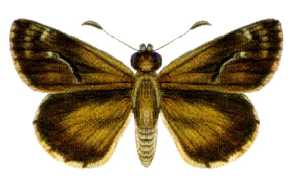

Scientific classification
- Kingdom: Animalia
- Phylum: Arthropoda
- Clade: Pancrustacea
- Class: Insecta
- Order: Lepidoptera
- Family: Hesperiidae
- Genus: Anisynta
- Species: A. dominula

Binomial name
- Anisynta dominula Plötz, 1884

Synonyms
- List: Anisynta draco; Anisynta dyris; Telesto dominula; Telesto drachmophora; Motasingha pria

= Anisynta dominula =

Species of butterfly

Anisynta dominula, the two-brand grass-skipper or dominula skipper, is a species of butterfly in the family Hesperiidae. It is found in Australia in the mountains of New South Wales, Tasmania and Victoria.

The larvae feed on Poa sieberiana. The wing span is about 3 cm.

== Subspecies ==
- Anisynta dominula dominula
- Anisynta dominula drachmophora
- Anisynta dominula draco
- Anisynta dominula dyris
- Anisynta dominula pria
