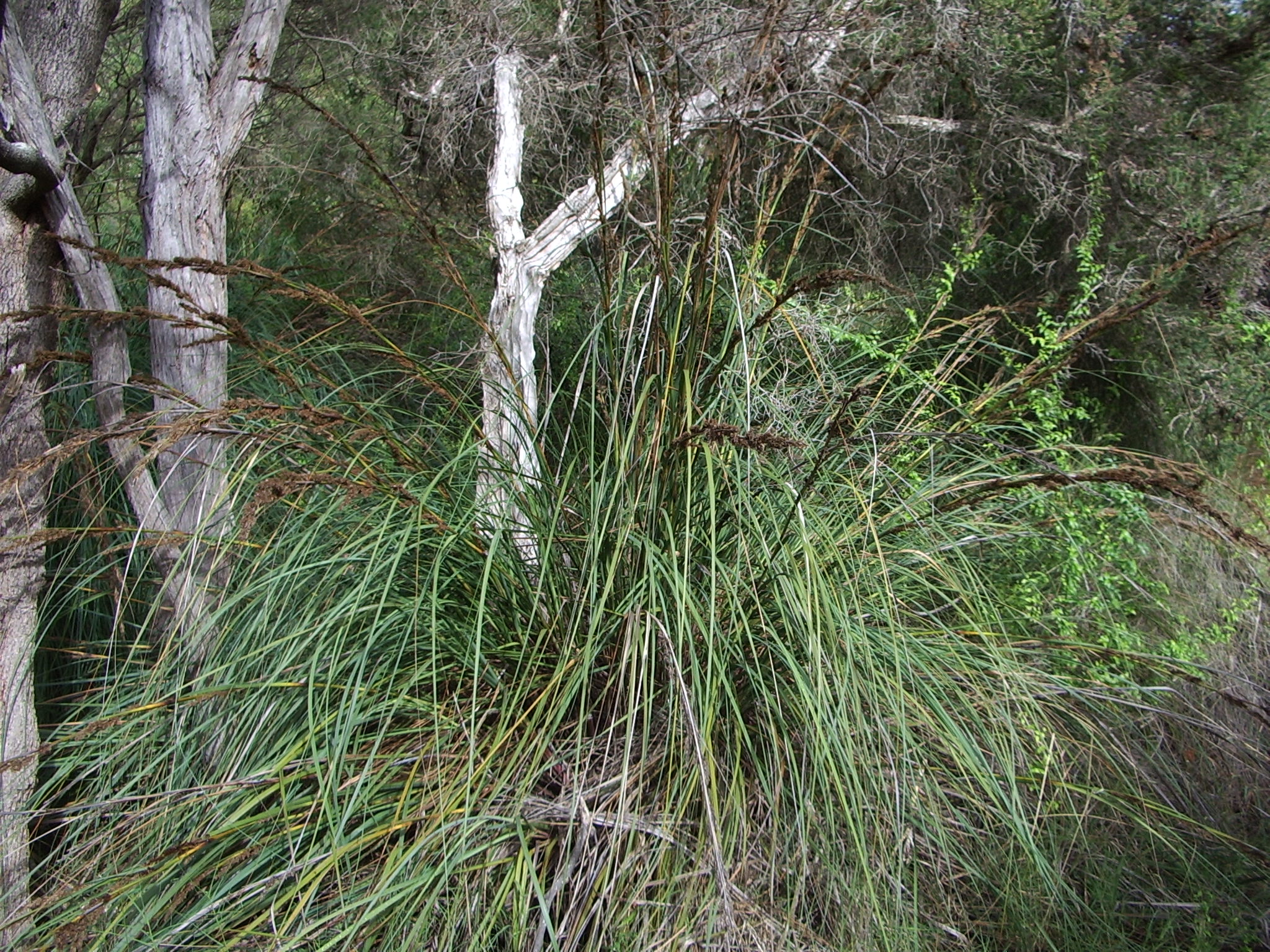

Scientific classification
- Kingdom: Plantae
- Clade: Tracheophytes
- Clade: Angiosperms
- Clade: Monocots
- Clade: Commelinids
- Order: Poales
- Family: Cyperaceae
- Genus: Gahnia
- Species: G. decomposita

Binomial name
- Gahnia decomposita (R.Br.) Benth., 1878

= Gahnia decomposita =

Species of plant

Gahnia decomposita is a tussock-forming perennial in the family Cyperaceae, that is native to southern parts of Western Australia.
