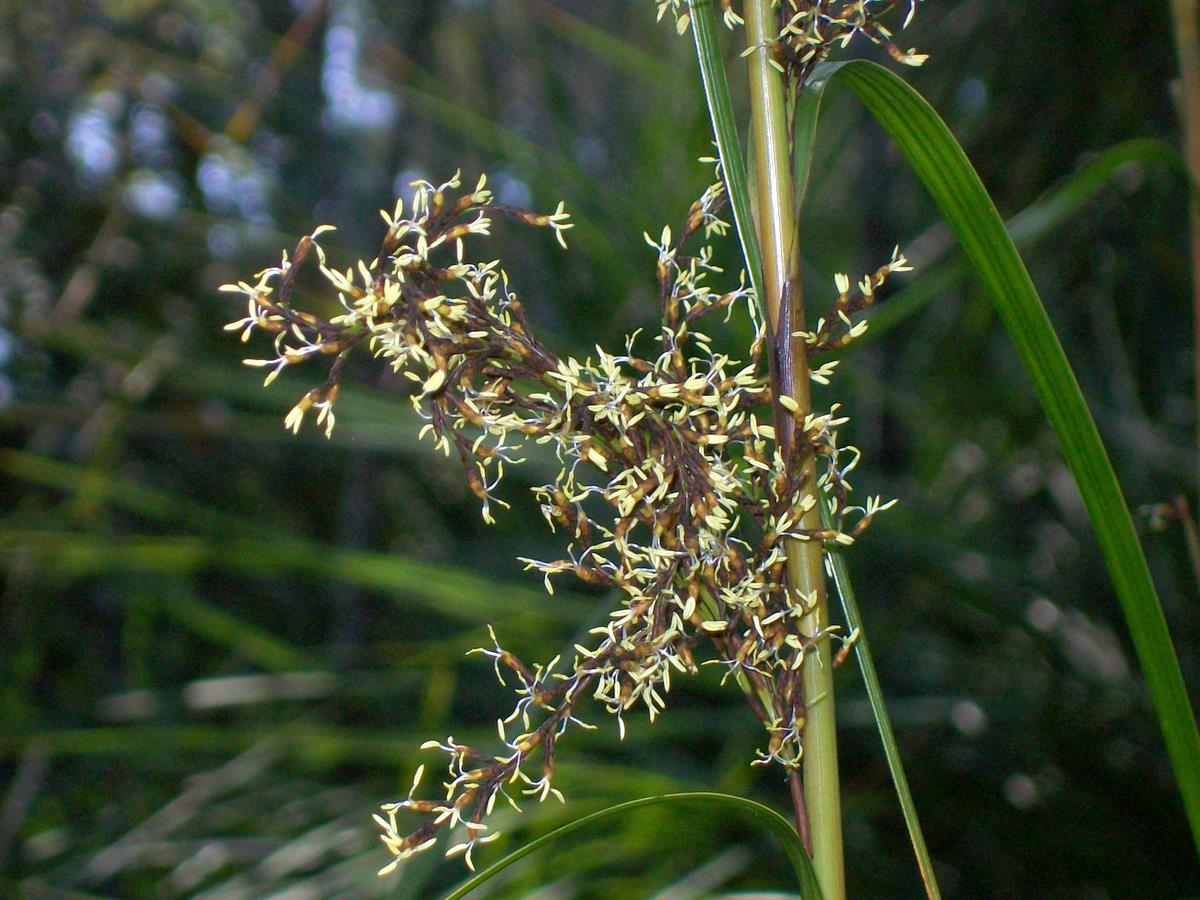
- Ku-ring-gai Chase National Park, Australia

Scientific classification
- Kingdom: Plantae
- Clade: Tracheophytes
- Clade: Angiosperms
- Clade: Monocots
- Clade: Commelinids
- Order: Poales
- Family: Cyperaceae
- Genus: Gahnia
- Species: G. melanocarpa

Binomial name
- Gahnia melanocarpa R.Br.

Synonyms
- Cladium melanocarpum (R.Br.) F.Muell.; Mariscus melanocarpus (R.Br.) Kuntze

= Gahnia melanocarpa =

Species of grass-like plant

Gahnia melanocarpa, known as the black fruit saw-sedge, is a tussock forming perennial plant in eastern Australia. Often found in the wetter forests or in rainforest margins, it is common on the coast but also seen in the tablelands.

== Overview ==
Gahnia melanocarpa grows to 2 metres (6 ft 7 in) high. The leaf edges are sharp and can easily cut human skin. The strap-like leaves are around 10 mm (0.39 in) wide.

The flowers grow in spikes from the centre of the plant and appear in spring and summer. They are followed by shiny dark brown to black nuts, which measure 2.5 to 3.5 mm (0.098 to 0.138 in) long and 1.5 to 2 mm (0.059 to 0.079 in) in diameter. The specific epithet melanocarpa translates from the Greek meaning "black fruit".

The species first appeared in scientific literature in Prodromus Florae Novae Hollandiae in 1810, authored by Robert Brown.
