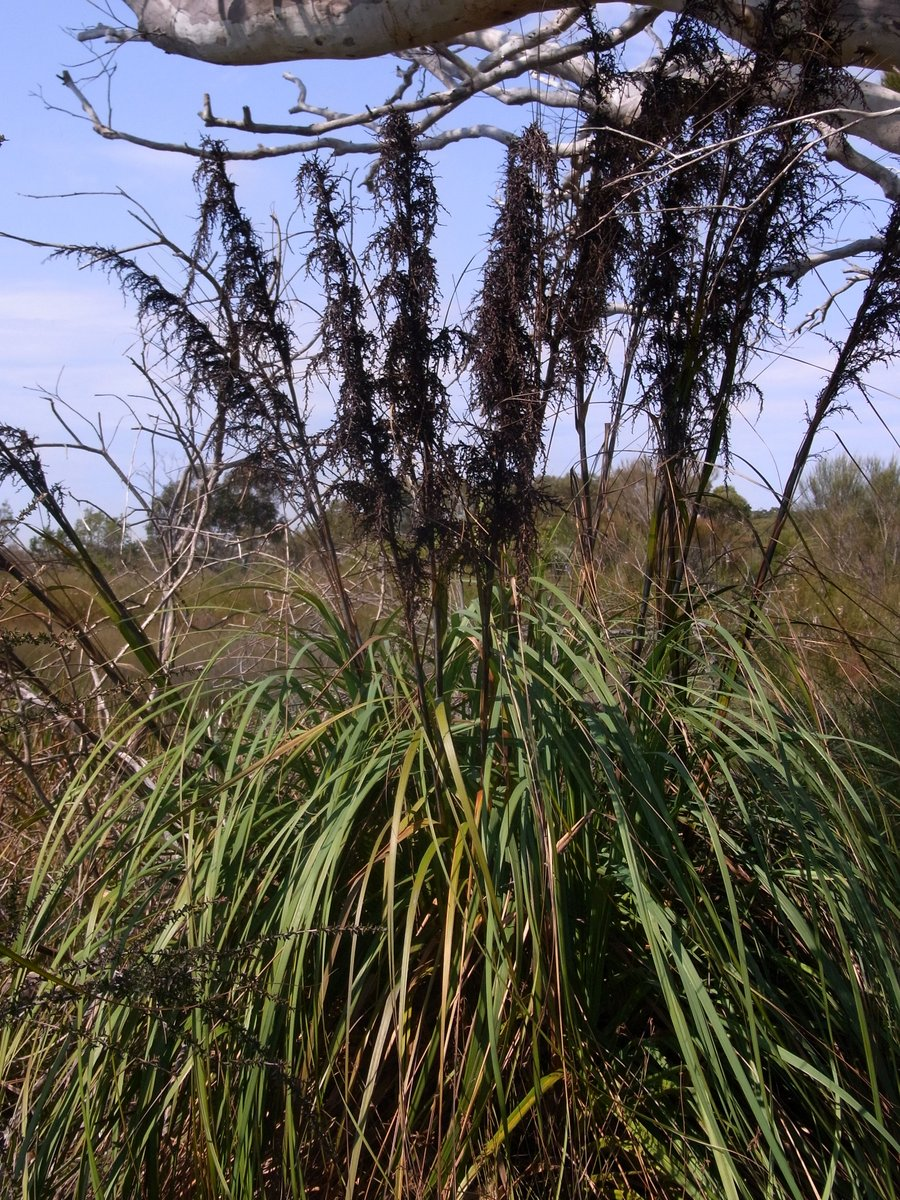
- Ku-ring-gai Chase National Park, Australia

Scientific classification
- Kingdom: Plantae
- Clade: Tracheophytes
- Clade: Angiosperms
- Clade: Monocots
- Clade: Commelinids
- Order: Poales
- Family: Cyperaceae
- Genus: Gahnia
- Species: G. sieberiana

Binomial name
- Gahnia sieberiana Kunth

= Gahnia sieberiana =

Red-fruit saw-sedge

Species of plant

Gahnia sieberiana, commonly known as the red-fruit saw-sedge, is a tussock-forming perennial plant in the family Cyperaceae, endemic to Australia. It is a widespread plant that favours damp sunny sites. Many insect larvae have been recorded feeding on the red-fruit saw-sedge. It may grow over 2 metres (6 ft 7 in) tall.

Gahnia sieberiana was described by German botanist Carl Sigismund Kunth in 1837. It is one of the many species named in honour of the Bohemian collector, Franz Wilhelm Sieber.

Gahnia sieberiana grows as a tall strappy tussock to 2 metres (6 ft 7 in) high and wide, with rough flat leaves. The leaf margins have tiny serrations that are sharp and can cut the hands of those handling the plant. The tall black flowers grow in spikes from the centre of the plant and can rise another metre above the clump, appearing in spring and summer. They are followed by shiny red or red-brown round nuts, which measure 2.5 to 4.0 mm (0.1 to 0.2 in) long, 1.5 to 2.0 mm (0.1 to 0.1 in) in diameter.

Gahnia sieberiana is found across eastern Australia, from Tasmania to North Queensland, as well as Malesia, from sea level to an altitude of 1,200 m (3,900 ft). It is found on clay and sandy soils.

Seeds appear to germinate after bushfire. The caterpillars of the dingy grass-skipper (Toxidia peron), montane sedge-skipper (Oreisplanus perornata), silver sedge-skipper (Hesperilla crypsargyra), flame sedge-skipper (Hesperilla idothea), golden-haired sedge-skipper (Hesperilla chrysotricha), heath sand-skipper (Antipodia chaostola), sword-grass brown (Tisiphone abeona) and northern sword-grass brown (Tisiphone helena) feed on the leaves.

For Australian gardens, Gahnia sieberiana has been suggested as a native replacement for pampas grass (Cortaderia selloana), which is a noxious weed there. Cultivation is hampered by difficulties in propagation by seed. Clumps can be divided to make more plants.
