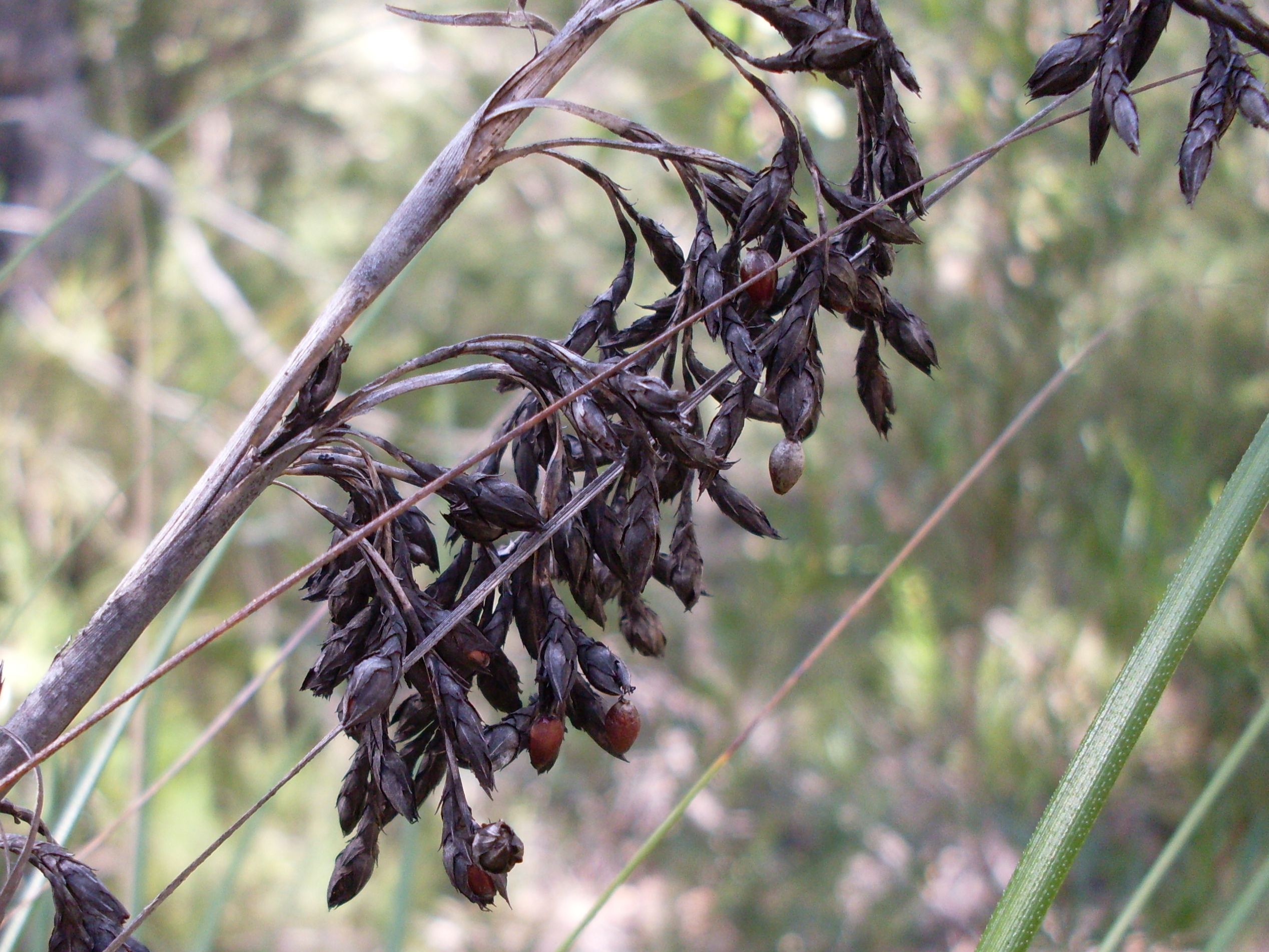

Scientific classification
- Kingdom: Plantae
- Clade: Tracheophytes
- Clade: Angiosperms
- Clade: Monocots
- Clade: Commelinids
- Order: Poales
- Family: Cyperaceae
- Genus: Gahnia
- Species: G. erythrocarpa

Binomial name
- Gahnia erythrocarpa R.Br.

= Gahnia erythrocarpa =

Species of grass-like plant

Gahnia erythrocarpa is a leafy sedge, growing up to 2 metres tall. Found in damp areas in forest or woodland in the Sydney district of Australia. This is one of the many plants first published by Robert Brown with the type known as "(J.) v.v." appearing in his Prodromus Florae Novae Hollandiae et Insulae Van Diemen in 1810. The specific epithet erythrocarpa is from ancient Greek and refers to the red seeds.
