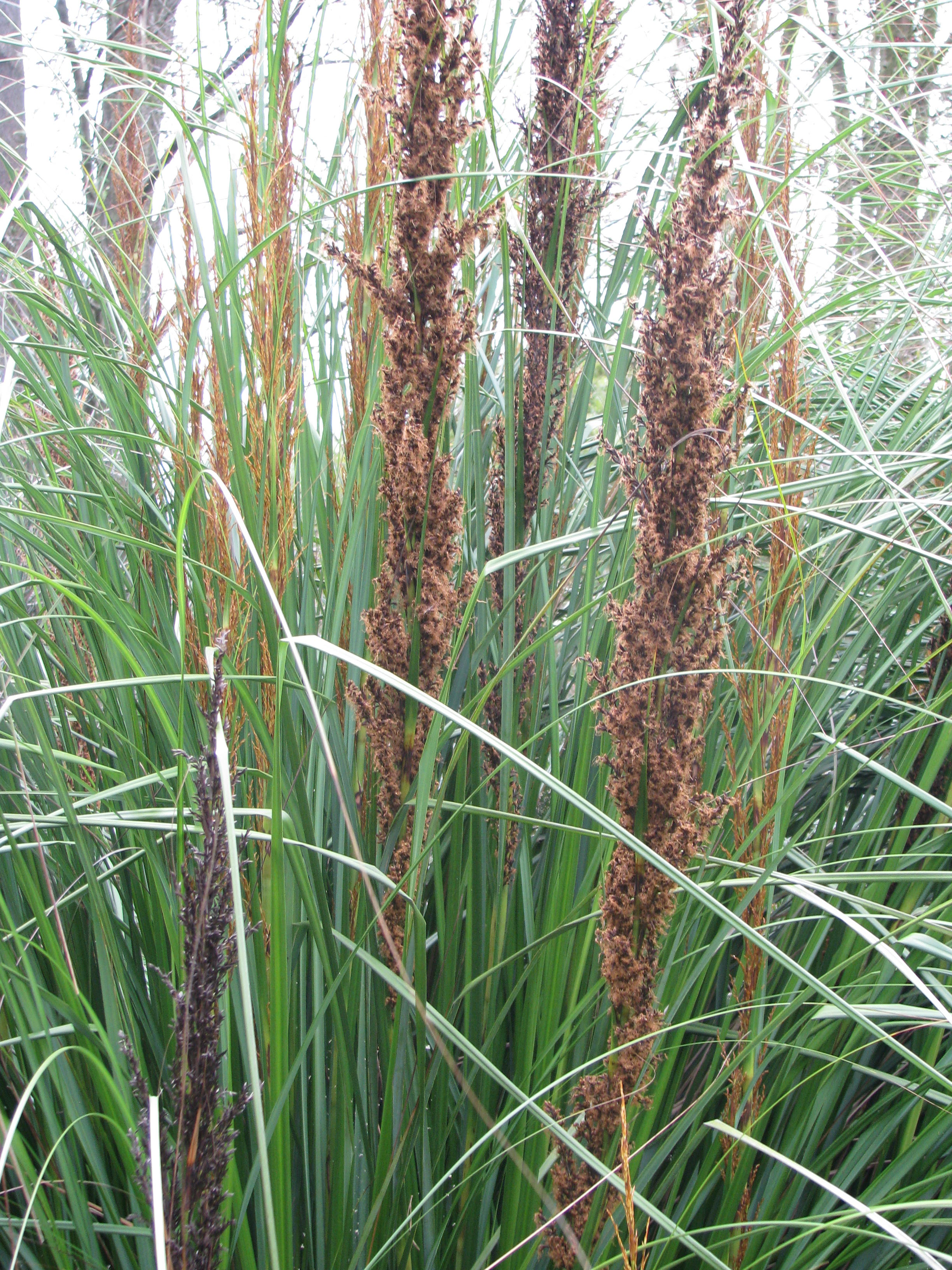
- Gahnia australis

Scientific classification
- Kingdom: Plantae
- Clade: Tracheophytes
- Clade: Angiosperms
- Clade: Monocots
- Clade: Commelinids
- Order: Poales
- Family: Cyperaceae
- Genus: Gahnia; J.R. & G.Forst

Synonyms
- Lampocarya R.Br.; Epiandria C.Presl; Didymonema C.Presl; Melachne Schrad. ex Schult. & Schult.f. in J.J.Roemer & J.A.Schultes; Psittacoschoenus Nees in J.G.C.Lehmann

= Gahnia =

Genus of grass-like plants

Gahnia (sawsedge, saw-sedge) is a genus of sedges native to China, Southeast Asia, New Guinea, Australia, New Zealand and a number of Pacific Islands. The common name is due to the toothed margins. It often forms tussocks.

== Species ==
Accepted species:

- Gahnia ancistrophylla Benth. – Western Australia, South Australia, Victoria
- Gahnia aristata Benth. – Western Australia
- Gahnia aspera (R.Br.) Spreng. – Maluku, New Guinea, Queensland, New South Wales, Melanesia, Bonin Islands, Hawaii
- Gahnia australis (Nees) K.L.Wilson – Western Australia
- Gahnia baniensis Benl. – Fujian, Guangdong, Guangxi, Hainan, Vietnam, Borneo, Malaysia, Sumatra
- Gahnia beecheyi H.Mann – forest sawsedge – Hawaii
- Gahnia clarkei Benl – New Guinea, New South Wales, Queensland, Victoria
- Gahnia decomposita (R.Br.) Benth. – Western Australia
- Gahnia deusta (R.Br.) Benth. – Western Australia, South Australia, Victoria
- Gahnia drummondii (Steud.) K.L.Wilson – Western Australia
- Gahnia erythrocarpa R.Br. – New South Wales
- Gahnia filifolia (C.Presl) Kük. ex Benl – New South Wales
- Gahnia filum (Labill.) F.Muell.— chaffy sawsedge – Australia, all states except Queensland
- Gahnia graminifolia Rodway – Tasmania
- Gahnia grandis (Labill.) S.T.Blake – Queensland, New South Wales, Victoria
- Gahnia halmaturina R.L.Barrett & K.L.Wilson – South Australia
- Gahnia howeana R.O.Gardner – Lord Howe Island
- Gahnia hystrix J.M.Black – Kangaroo Island
- Gahnia insignis S.T.Blake – Queensland, New South Wales
- Gahnia javanica Moritzi – Yunnan, Vietnam, Malaysia, Borneo, Java, Sumatra, Sulawesi, Philippines, New Guinea, Solomon Islands
- Gahnia lacera (R.Lesson ex A.Rich.) Steud. – Cutty grass – New Zealand North Island
- Gahnia lanaiensis O.Deg., I.Deg. & J.Kern -- Lanaʻi sawsedge – Lanaʻi Island of Hawai'i
- Gahnia lanigera (R.Br.) Benth. – Western Australia, South Australia, Victoria, New South Wales
- Gahnia marquisensis F.Br. – Marquesas
- Gahnia melanocarpa R.Br. – Black-fruit saw-sedge – Queensland, New South Wales, Victoria
- Gahnia microcarpa Guillaumin – New Caledonia
- Gahnia microstachya Benth. – Victoria, New South Wales, Tasmania
- Gahnia novocaledonensis Benl – New Caledonia
- Gahnia pauciflora Kirk – Cutting sedge – New Zealand North and South Islands
- Gahnia procera J.R.Forst. & G.Forst. – Mountain sedge – New Zealand North and South Islands
- Gahnia radula (R.Br.) Benth. – Thatch saw-sedge – Victoria, New South Wales, Tasmania, South Australia
- Gahnia rigida Kirk – New Zealand North and South Islands
- Gahnia schoenoides G.Forst. – Society Islands
- Gahnia sclerioides K.L.Wilson – Western Australia
- Gahnia setifolia Hook.f. – Māpere, razor sedge – New Zealand North and South Islands
- Gahnia sieberiana Kunth – Red-fruited saw sedge – Australia, New Guinea, Sulawesi, Solomon Islands, New Caledonia
- Gahnia sinuosa J.Raynal – New Caledonia
- Gahnia subaequiglumis S.T.Blake – Queensland, New South Wales, Victoria
- Gahnia trifida Labill. – Coast saw-sedge – Victoria, South Australia, Tasmania, Western Australia
- Gahnia tristis Nees in W.J.Hooker & G.A.W.Arnott – China, Ryukyu Islands, Thailand, Vietnam, Borneo, Malaysia, Sumatra
- Gahnia vitiensis Rendle -- Fijian sawsedge – Fiji, Hawaii
- Gahnia xanthocarpa (Hook.f.) Hook.f. – Māpere, gahnia – New Zealand North and South Islands

== Conservation ==
The species Gahnia lanaiensis has been known as a rare endemic plant from the Hawaiian island of Lanai and it was federally listed as an endangered species of the United States. In 2010, however, research suggested that the Lanai plants are actually Gahnia lacera introduced from New Zealand in the early 20th century.
