= Gahnia filifolia =

Scientific classification
- Kingdom: Plantae
- Clade: Tracheophytes
- Clade: Angiosperms
- Clade: Monocots
- Clade: Commelinids
- Order: Poales
- Family: Cyperaceae
- Genus: Gahnia
- Species: G. filifolia

Binomial name
- Gahnia filifolia (C.Presl) Kük. ex Benl 1940

Species of plant

Gahnia filifolia is a tussock-forming perennial in the family Cyperaceae, that is native to central parts of New South Wales.
