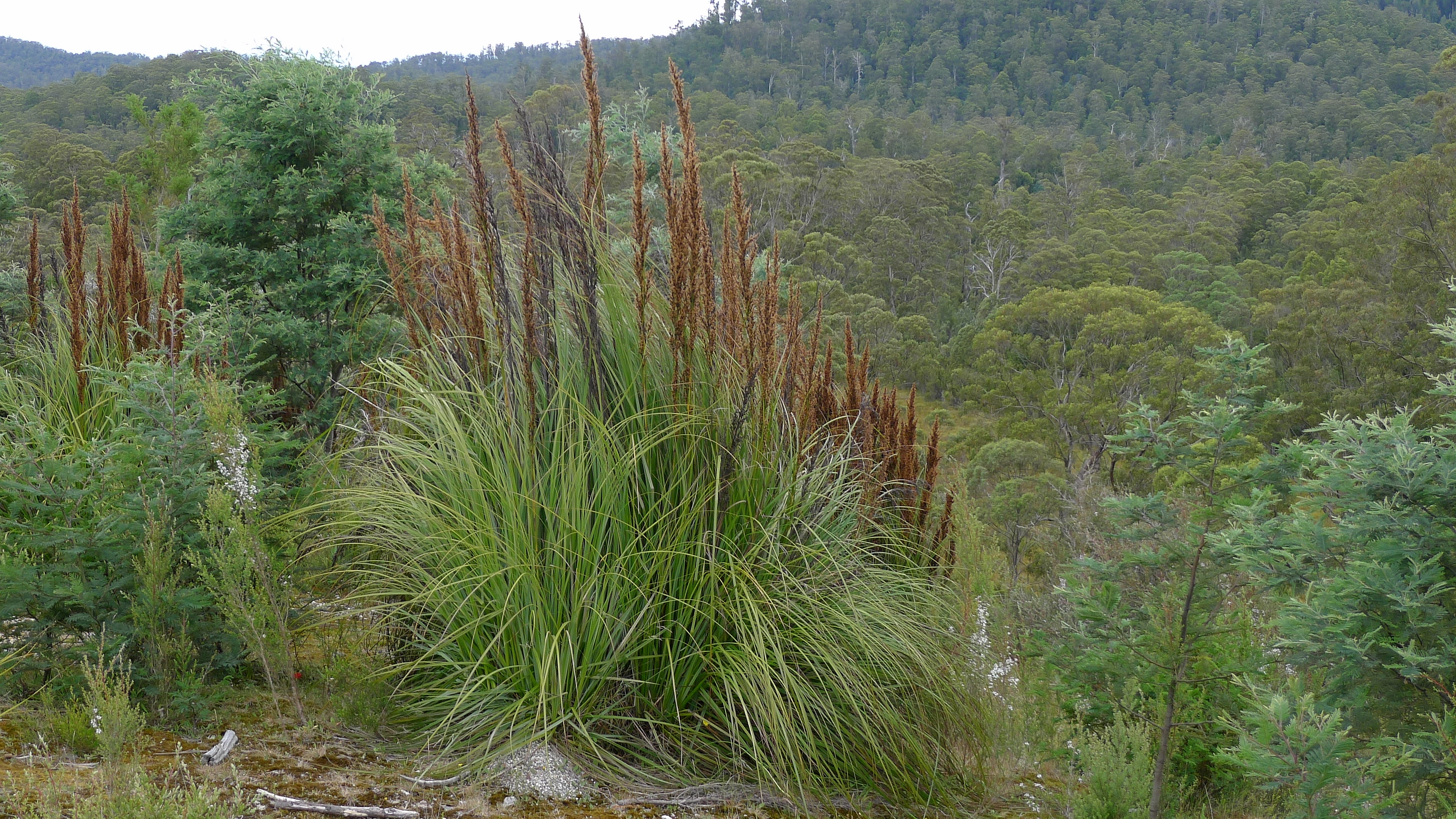

Scientific classification
- Kingdom: Plantae
- Clade: Embryophytes
- Clade: Tracheophytes
- Clade: Spermatophytes
- Clade: Angiosperms
- Clade: Monocots
- Clade: Commelinids
- Order: Poales
- Family: Cyperaceae
- Genus: Gahnia
- Species: G. grandis

Binomial name
- Gahnia grandis (Labill.) S.T.Blake.

Synonyms
- Scleria grandis Labill.

= Gahnia grandis =

Species of plant

Gahnia grandis is a tussock-forming perennial plant found in southeastern mainland Australia and Tasmania.

Originally described by botanist Jacques Labillardière as Scleria grandis in 1800, it was placed in its current genus by S. T. Blake in 1969. In Tasmania, Gahnia is the most widely seen genus, with seven native species. Six of these species are very large, erect graminoids with sharp-edged leaves resembling a razor, hence the common names cutting grass and cutty grass.

== Description ==
Gahnia grandis is a perennial tussock-forming sedge growing to 1–3 × 2–3m tall. The flowering stems are stout, often sprawling before becoming erect. The sharp-edged leaves are flat, brown-sheathed, and channelling to a 2.5m long, narrow, spiral stem. The inflorescences emerge from a long, tangled stem with weeping leaves. The stems (culms) are stout, 1–3 m high and c. 2–10 mm in diameter, often sprawling for 1–2 m from their base. It is widespread throughout Tasmania.

Flowers may be drooping, with spikes 50–100 cm long. They are often one-sided, with bracts much shorter on the lower than on the upper side. The flower-heads are panicle-like in shape. The flowers are in spikelets. Each spikelet is two-flowered, the upper flower being bisexual and the lower flower sterile or male. The lowest glumes, which number 8-12, are much shorter than the upper glumes, and are irregularly toothed at the brown to dark grey-brown erose (also called margin). The erose is slightly rough to the touch. The apex of the plant's upper glumes is pointed to bluntly-rounded. The cream-coloured flowers possess 4-5 stamens with 2–3 mm long anthers. The smooth, dark reddish-brown to orange-brown seeds resemble a nut, and are oblong to narrow and ovaloid in shape. They are about 3.0–4.5 mm long, and 1.2–1.9 mm in diameter.

== Distribution and habitat ==
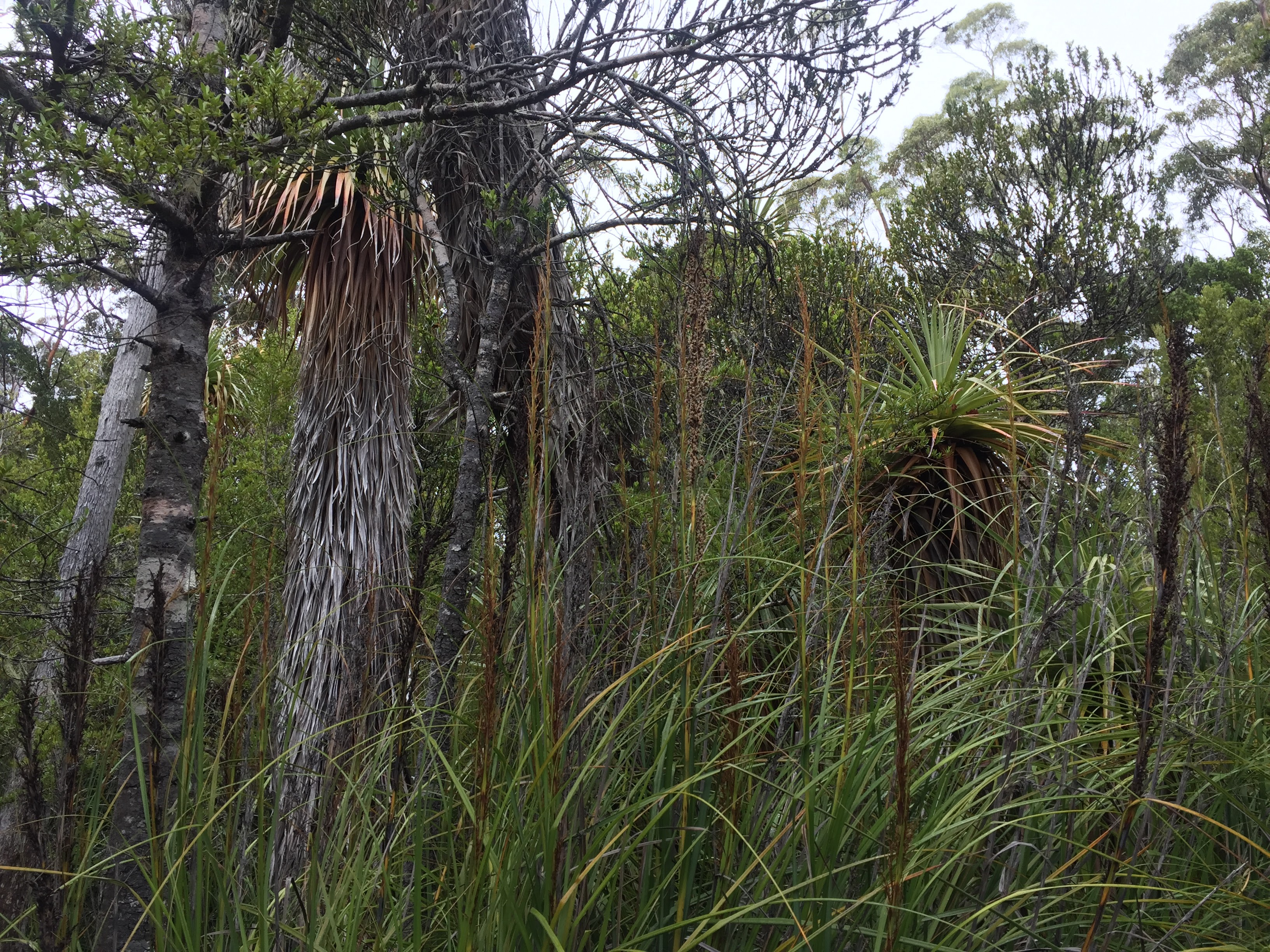
Cutting grass in southern Tasmania

Gahnia grandis originated in southern Australia. About 40 species are found in Australia, Asia, and the Pacific Islands. The species is found particularly in Western Australia, Queensland, New South Wales, Tasmania, and Victoria, where it is native to areas such as the Gippsland plain, Wilsons Promontory, and Highlands-Southern Fall bioregions. Past records in Victoria show it at only two possible sites: the Gembrook-Beenak area, and the northern part of Wilsons Promontory.

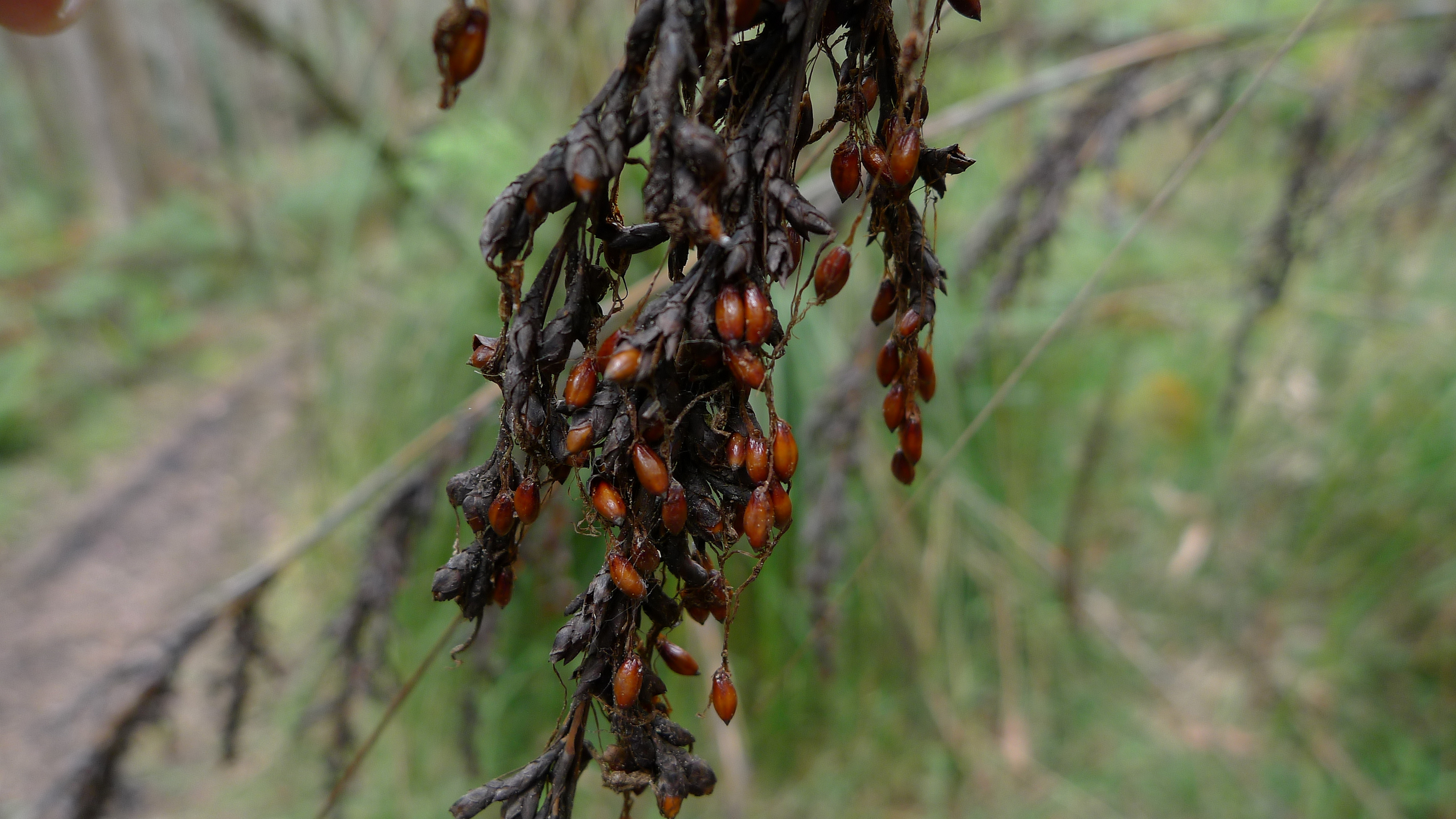
Mature Gahnia grandis seeds

Gahnia is common in Tasmania, which has seven native species of the plant. These species are widespread in wet forest, and are more frequently observed after fire. They are also found in coastal areas, sometimes also occurring in dry woodland.

Gahnia rodwayi, a small, grass-like plant found in the dry forests in the southeast of Tasmania, generally flowers between October and January. This species grows in moist soil beside water, in shady forest gullies and in dappled to semi-shade. Gahnia grandis is widespread in all regions of Tasmania except the midlands and the northeast, growing in poorly-drained soil types from sea-level to the mountains. It is also found on the margins of wetlands and forests, in riparian areas on button grass heaths, and along road cuttings and ditches.

== Uses ==
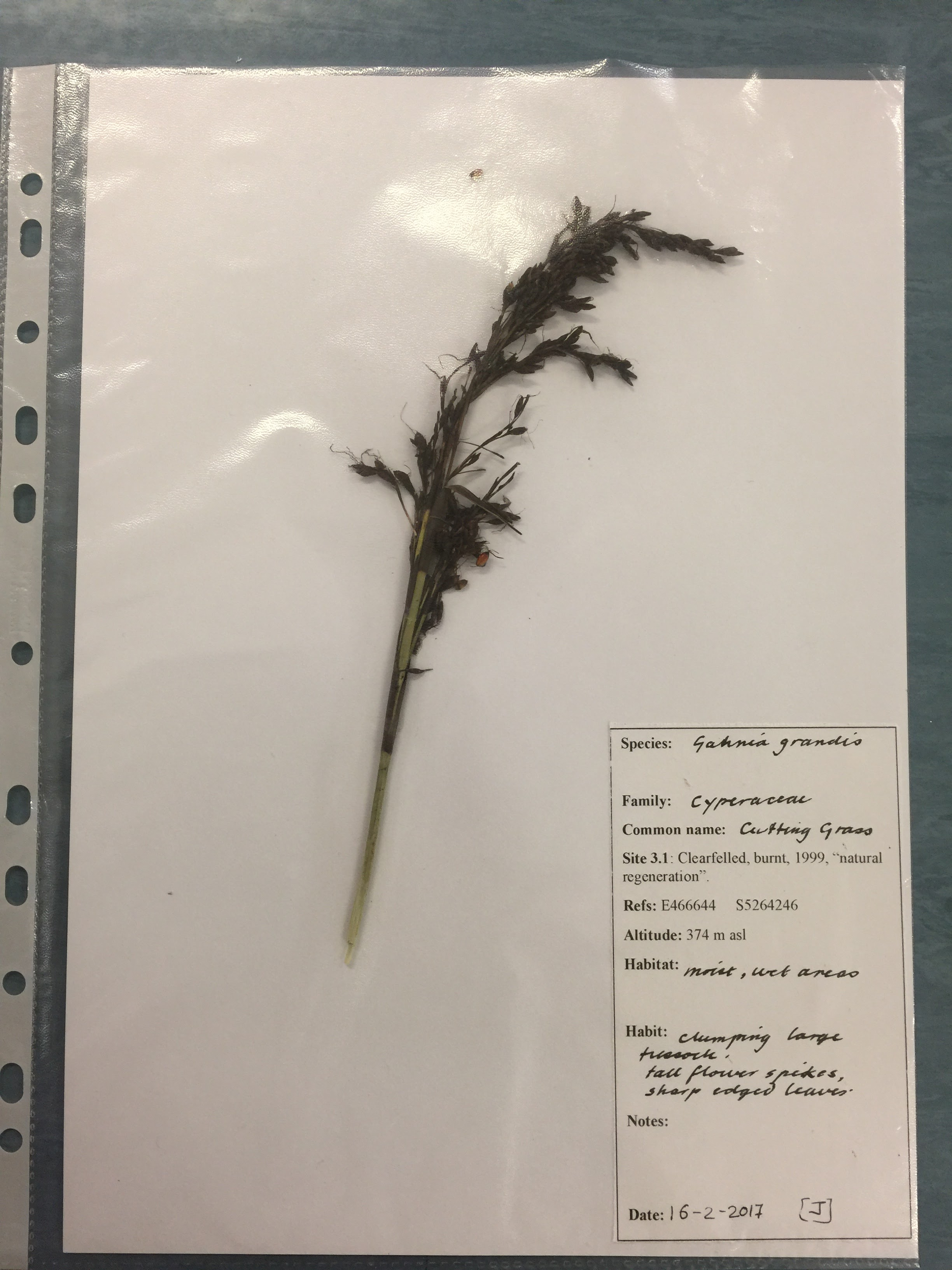
Gahnia grandis herbarium specimen

Cutting grass has traditionally been used by indigenous peoples and Aboriginal Islanders for basket-weaving and rope-making. The nuts were pounded and ground into flour to make bread, and the young bases of plants growing in wetter locations may be eaten.

Seed heads provide an attractive ornamental and decorative element. Gahnia species may also be used to attract birds and butterflies. The plants provide safe habitat for nesting birds, butterflies, caterpillars and other insects and animals, including threatened species like the eastern barred bandicoot. With financial support from the World Wide Fund for Nature (WWF), in late 2007 the Hobart City Council, the Threatened Species Network (TSN), the Tasmanian Parks and Wildlife Services, and the Tasmanian Department of Primary Industries and Water released a primary school education package and organized a teacher training workshop aimed at encouraging community participation in efforts for the conservation of the eastern barred bandicoot. The initiative highlighted the need to conserve Gahnia grandis and other native vegetation.

Gahnia grandis tolerates damp soil, drought, full sun or shade, and moderate frost up to −4 °C (25 °F), allowing use in various locations. It is planted to improve soil fertility, because Gahnia grandis helps prevent soil erosion. This species is also planted along roadsides, and surrounding farmland, as a natural protective boundary for marsupials and to provide insect habitat.

After drying, it can be used as fire fuel. It may be used to make craft objects, wooden furniture, baskets, ornaments, decorative artwork, and furniture items. It is also used decoratively in vases and flower pots, and can be planted as an ornamental garden species.

== Similar species ==
Many of the other Gahnia species are similar to Gahnia grandis. Although also referred to as cutting grass, they may be differentiated by seed heads, structure, and floral parts.

== Ecology ==
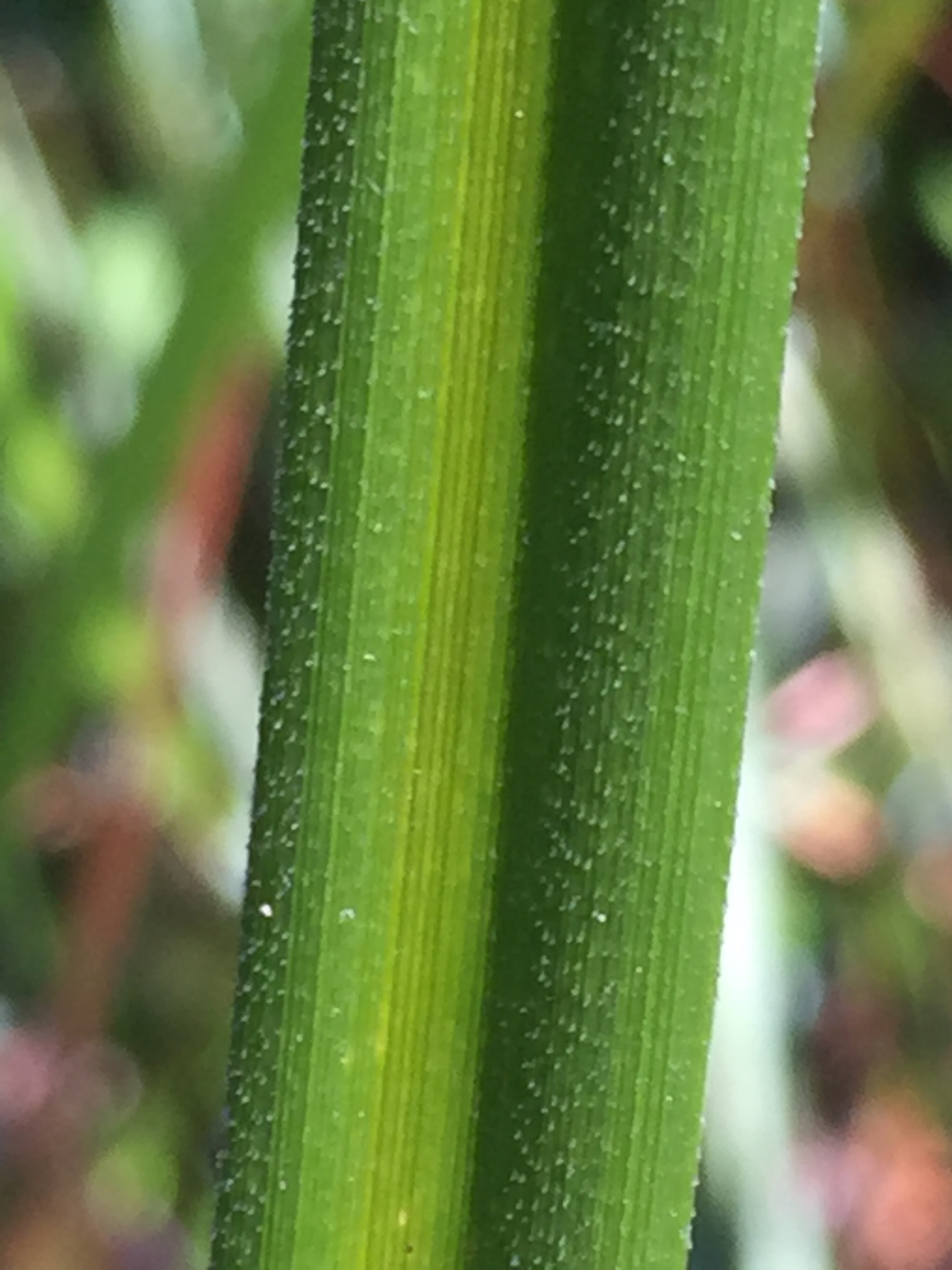
Rough Gahnia grandis stem texture

Gahnia grandis is a very hardy, perennial grass species with woody rhizomes, which forms large tussocks. Most of the year it is found in moist soil, often subject to periodic inundation. Once it is established, cutting grass is drought and wind tolerant. The flowering season is from spring through summer. Seed maturity can be predicted by the colour of the flower head, the bright brown immature fruits turning black at maturity. At this stage they are ready for use in food preparation.

Gahnia grandis is resistant to disease caused by the water mould Phytophthora cinnamomi, but is highly flammable.

Many species in the family Cyperaceae, including cutting grass, are considered important as food sources and safe habitat for native birds, such as the currawong, native insects, moths, and butterflies, such as the chaostola skipper (Antipodia chaostola leucophaea). The larvae of the choastola skipper feed nocturnally on Gahnia species, including Gahnia radula and Gahnia grandis. The butterfly plays a vital role in pollination. Many other insects also feed exclusively on Gahnia species.

Cutting grass is dependent for seed dispersal on birds such as the currawong, which eat the fruit then regurgitate the partially-digested hard inner nut. One hypothesis is that germination is facilitated by contact with the birds' stomach acid, which weakens the tough seed coat.

Cutting grass is also a key habitat species for the rare and threatened Burnie burrowing crayfish (Engaeus yabbimunna).

== Cultivation ==
Its long, sharp-edged leaves and untidy appearance make cutting grass relatively unsuitable for horticulture. But the species is used for rehabilitation and the regeneration of vegetation as its hardiness and soil-retaining properties are useful in preventing soil erosion.

Gahnia species in general are difficult to propagate. Seed germination is the best method, as plant division and transplantation gives limited results. Due to seed dormancy, seeds will not germinate earlier than 12 months after maturity. Seeds are best collected by cutting off seed heads at the base using secateurs then placing them to dry for several days on a groundsheet. Thrashing may be needed to dislodge the seeds, which should then be dry-stored for better conservation.
