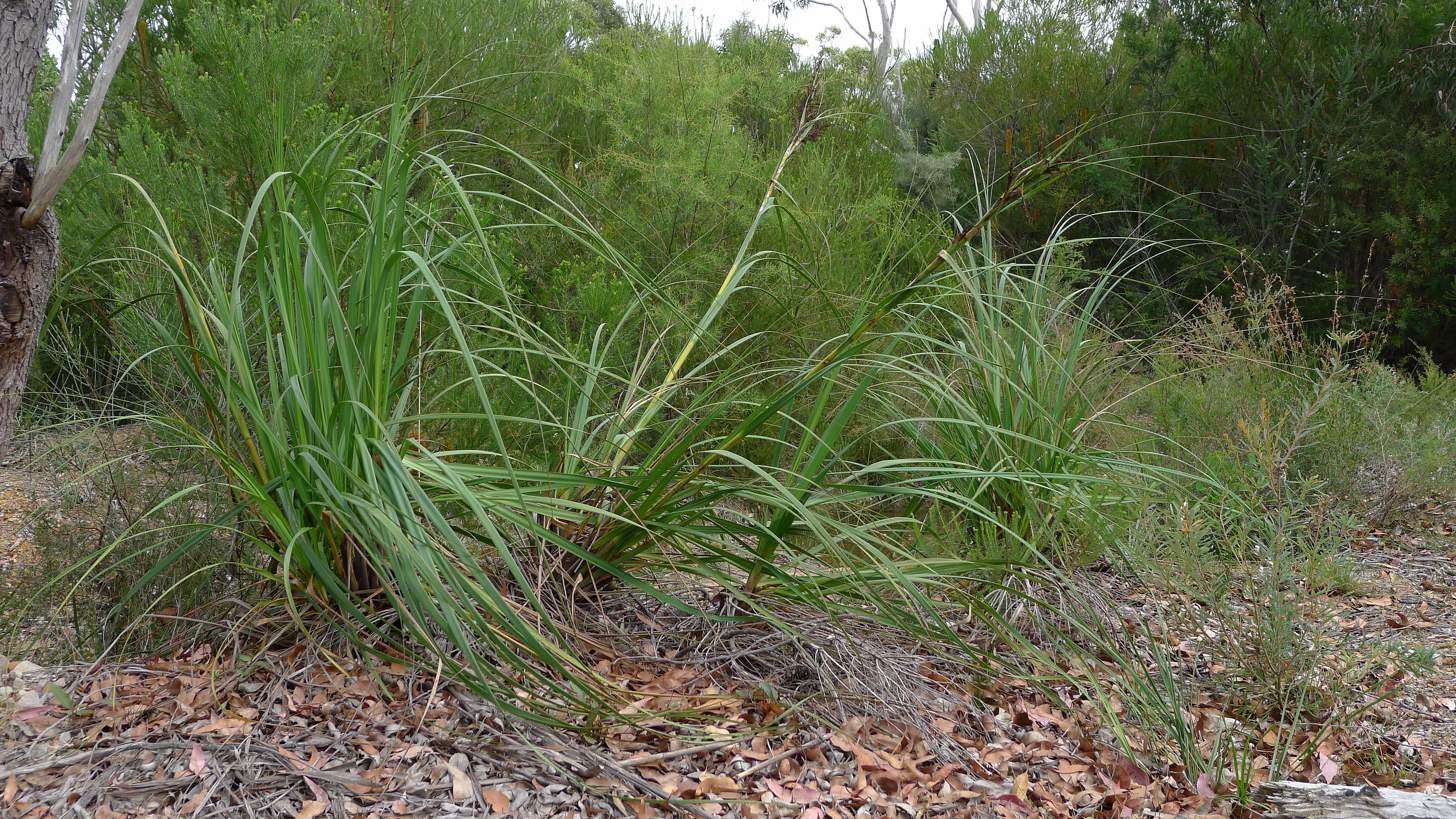
- Gahnia clarkei

Scientific classification
- Kingdom: Plantae
- Clade: Tracheophytes
- Clade: Angiosperms
- Clade: Monocots
- Clade: Commelinids
- Order: Poales
- Family: Cyperaceae
- Genus: Gahnia
- Species: G. clarkei

Binomial name
- Gahnia clarkei Benl

= Gahnia clarkei =

Species of grass-like plant

Gahnia clarkei (also known as tall sawsedge) is a species of evergreen plant from a sedge family that can be found in Australia. The plant is 1.5–2 metres (4 ft 11 in – 6 ft 7 in) high, with the same width. They grow during summer and have large black to brownish flowers. The flowers contain heads that produce small red seeds.
