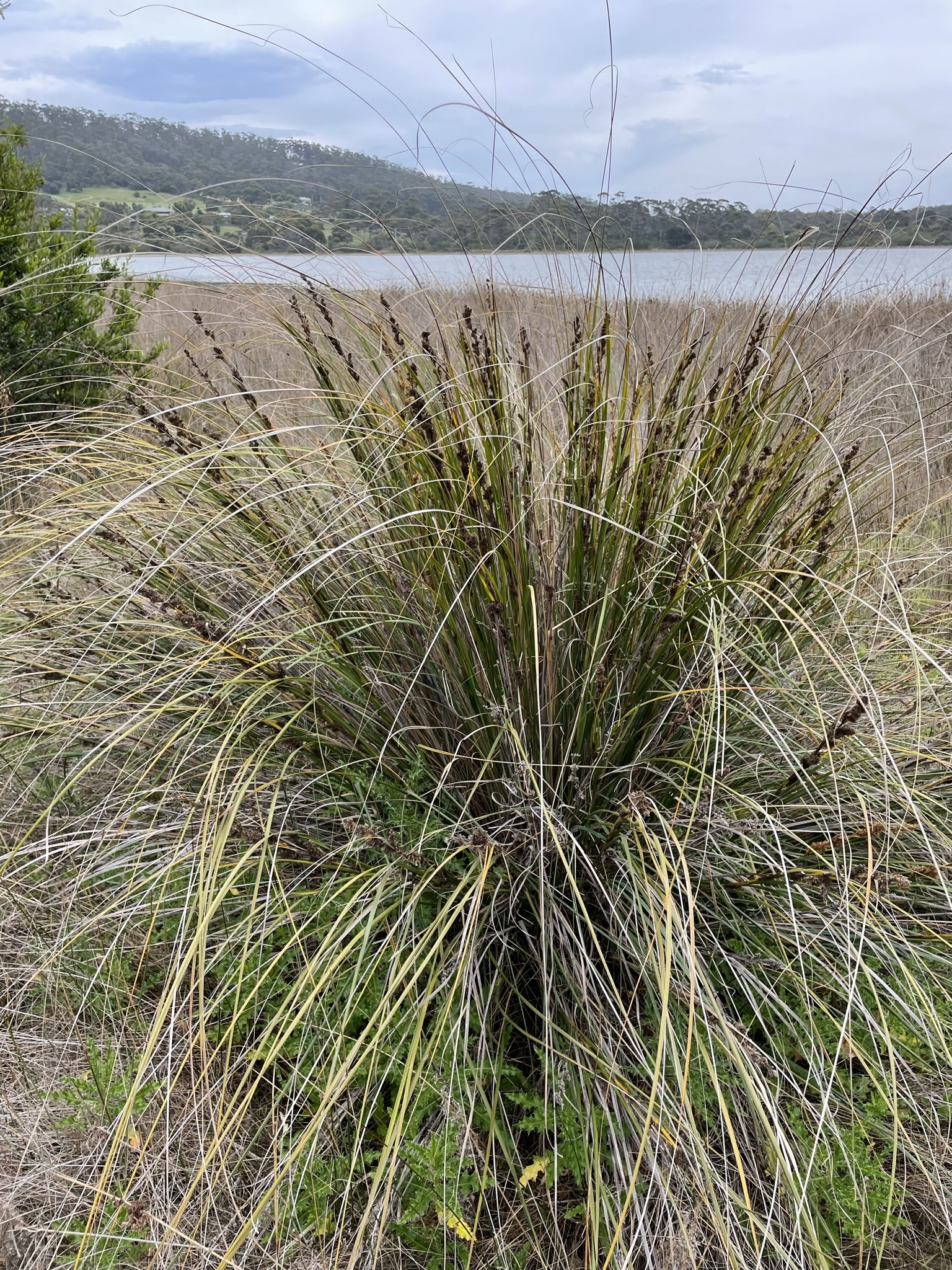
- Growing along the shore in Clarence, Tasmania, Australia.

Scientific classification
- Kingdom: Plantae
- Clade: Tracheophytes
- Clade: Angiosperms
- Clade: Monocots
- Clade: Commelinids
- Order: Poales
- Family: Cyperaceae
- Genus: Gahnia
- Species: G. trifida

Binomial name
- Gahnia trifida Labill.

= Gahnia trifida =

Species of plant

Gahnia trifida, the coastal saw-sedge, is a tussock-forming perennial in the family Cyperaceae, endemic to southern Australia.

A herb, sedge or grass-like, with very rough leaf margins and underside. The species grows in dense tussocks, 1.5 metres and 1 metre across, with leaves over 1 metre long and drooping. It is found on white or grey sand, or clay, that may be saline. The leaf blade is inrolled from the margin on the upper surface. Stems are rigid and erect. Branchlets containing the flowering heads emerge from axils at the main bracts. This branchlet has a spike-like arrangement of numerous, yellow or brown, clusters of flowerheads.

The species occurs in wetlands of coastal regions in Southwest Australia, South Australia, Victoria, and Tasmania. It is found on Rottnest Island where it grows near the inland salt lakes. The habitat is moist, often adjacent to creeks and swamps, and may also be saline.

The first description of Gahnia trifida was by Jacques Labillardière in Novae Hollandiae Plantarum Specimen (1805).
