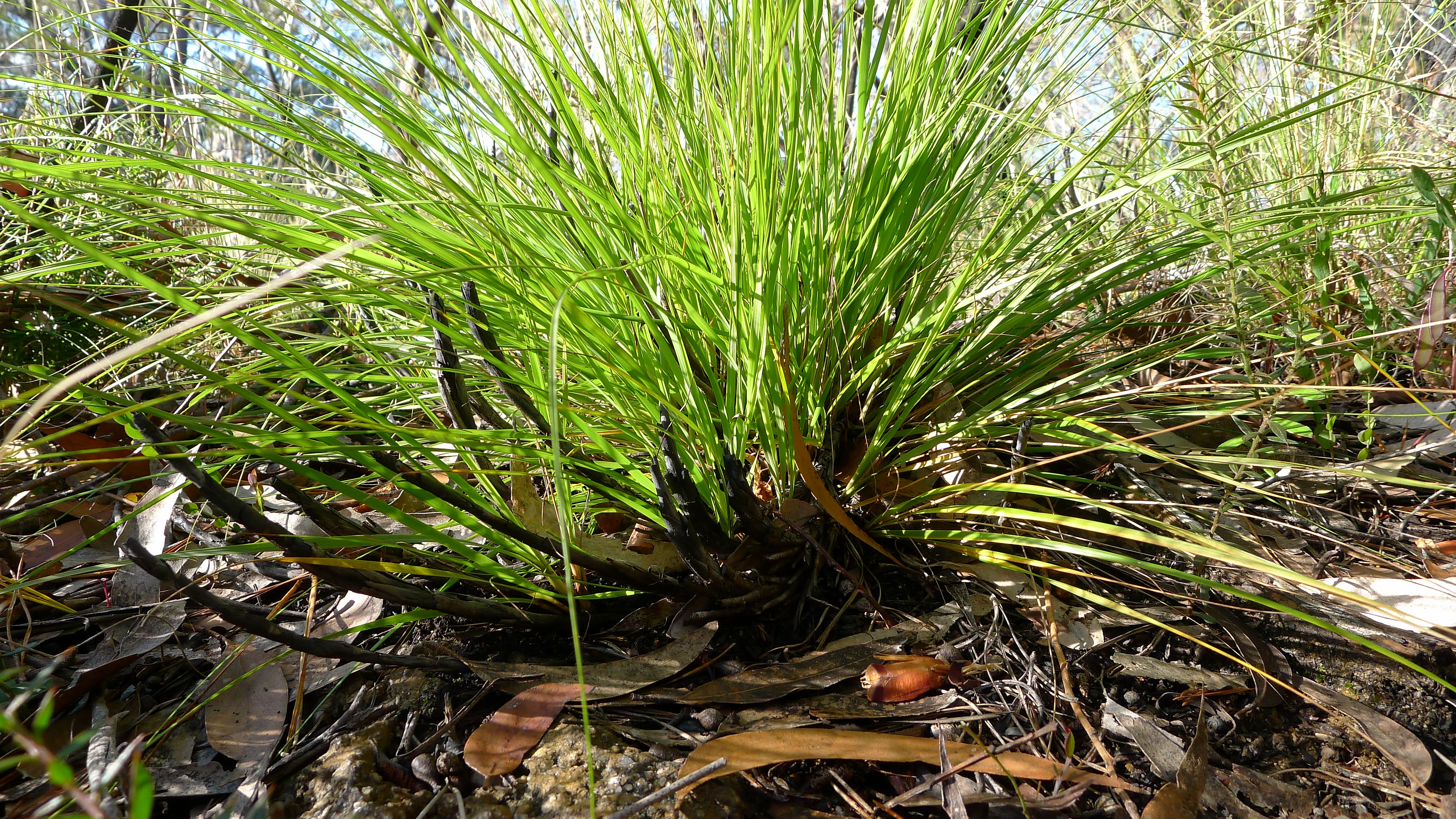

Scientific classification
- Kingdom: Plantae
- Clade: Tracheophytes
- Clade: Angiosperms
- Clade: Monocots
- Clade: Commelinids
- Order: Poales
- Family: Cyperaceae
- Genus: Gahnia
- Species: G. microstachya

Binomial name
- Gahnia microstachya Benth., 1878

= Gahnia microstachya =

Species of plant

Gahnia microstachya is a tussock-forming perennial in the family Cyperaceae, that is native to south eastern parts of Australia from New South Wales to Tasmania.
