= Gahnia radula =

Scientific classification
- Kingdom: Plantae
- Clade: Tracheophytes
- Clade: Angiosperms
- Clade: Monocots
- Clade: Commelinids
- Order: Poales
- Family: Cyperaceae
- Genus: Gahnia
- Species: G. radula

Binomial name
- Gahnia radula (R.Br.) Benth.

Species of plant

Gahnia radula, commonly known as the thatch saw-sedge is a tufted perennial sedge native to south-eastern Australia. The leaves are long, flat and rough, with sharp edges. It has a distinctive brown inflorescence, which darkens to black. It grows to 50–100 cm in height, spreads through its rhizomes and is found in eucalypt forest and grassy woodland.
