= List of butterflies of Victoria =

Over 140 species of butterfly that are found in the south-eastern Australian state of Victoria. This list includes native and introduced species and subspecies.

== Papilionidae ==
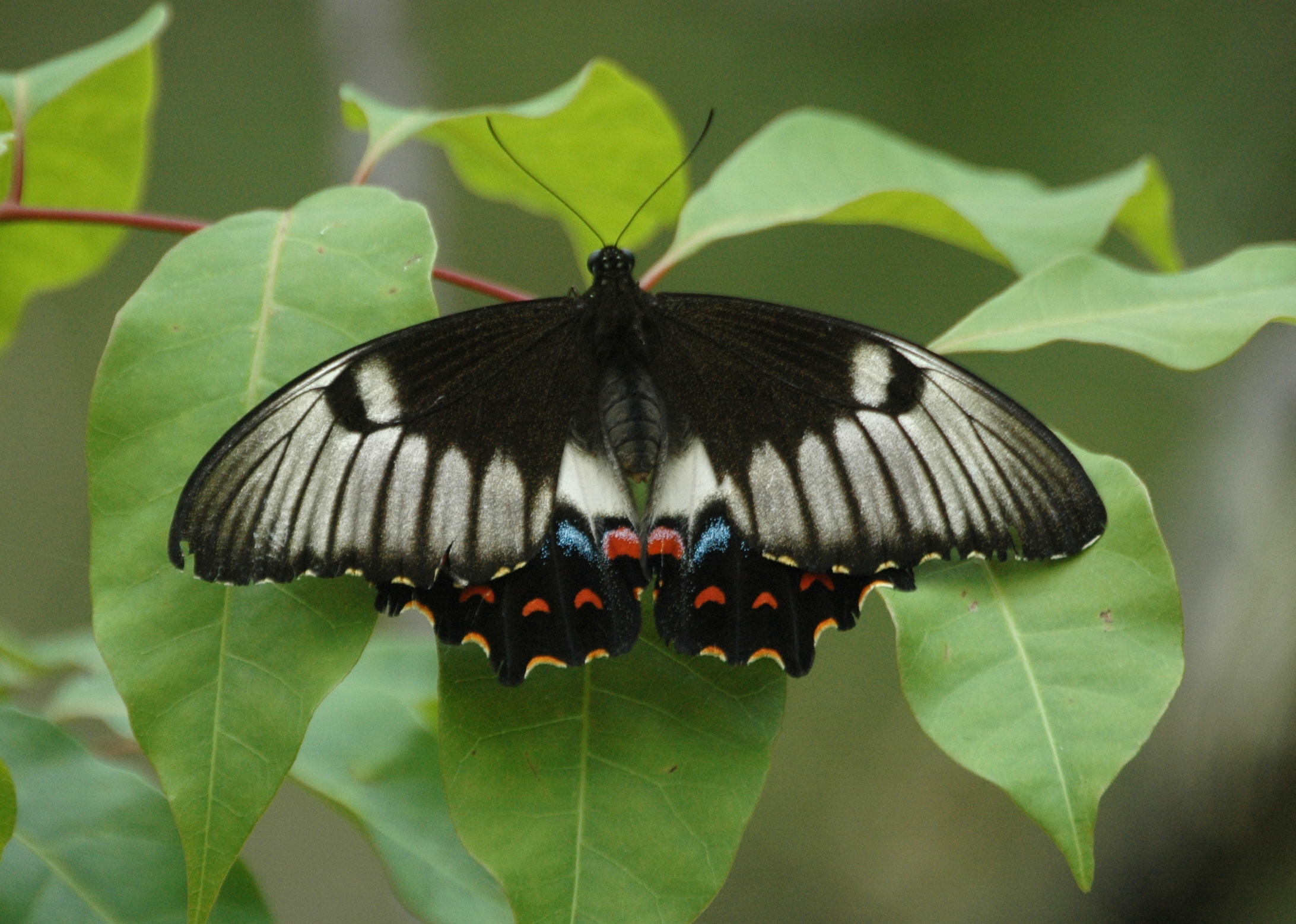
Orchard swallowtail

family: Papilionidae (swallowtails) — 4 species

genus: Graphium

- Macleay's swallowtail, Graphium macleayanus

genus: Papilio

- Orchard swallowtail, Papilio aegeus
- Dainty swallowtail, Papilio anactus
- Chequered swallowtail, Papilio demoleus

== Pieridae ==
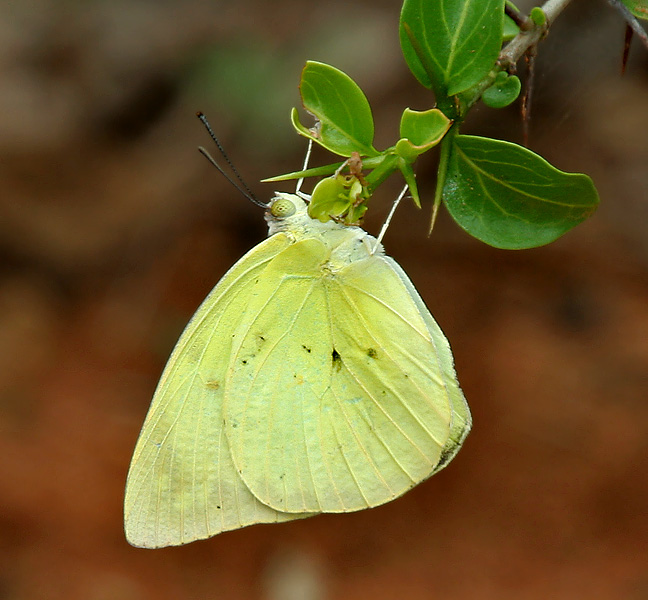
Lemon migrant

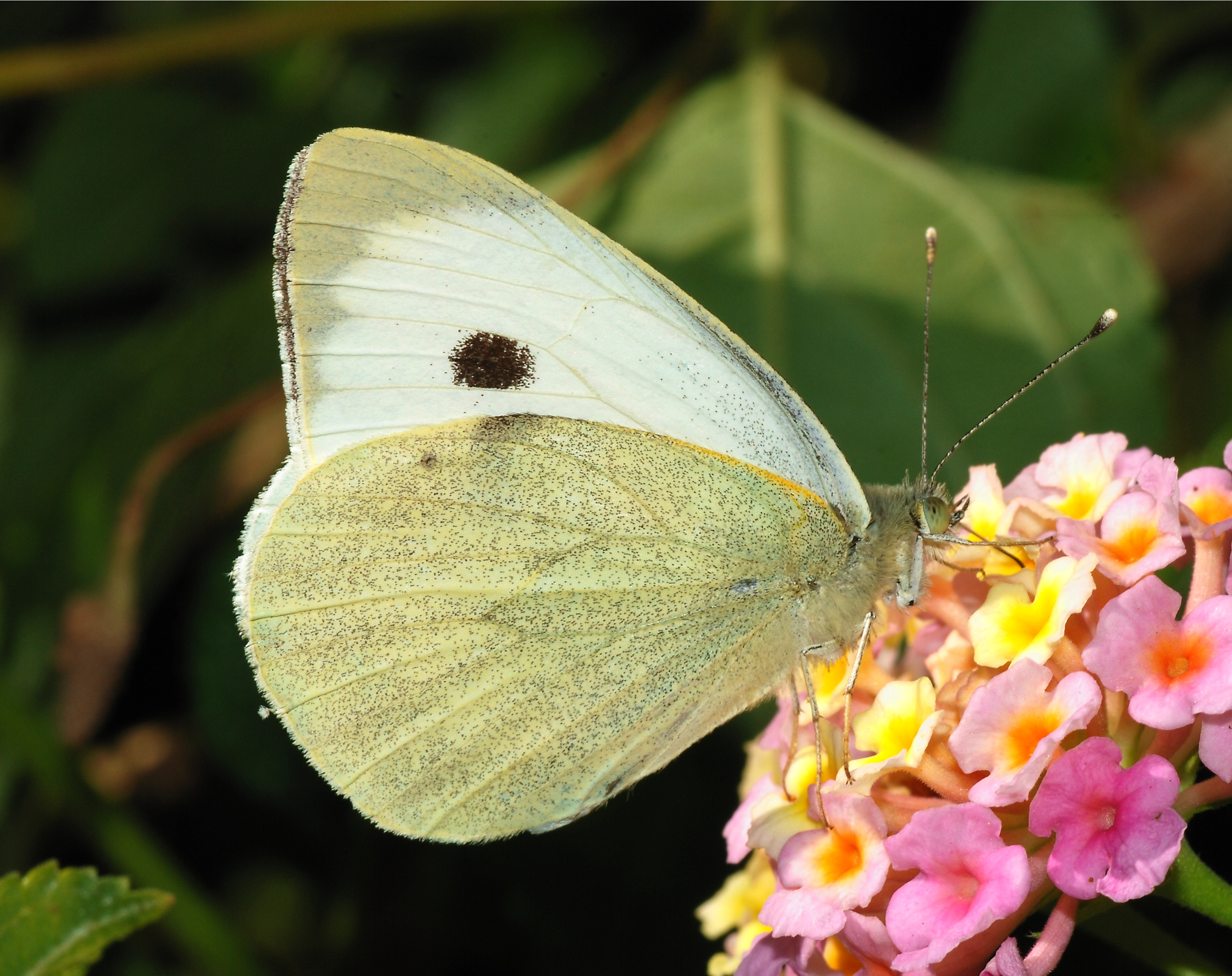
Small white

family: Pieridae (whites and yellows) — 12 + 1 species [1 introduced species]

genus: Appias

- Yellow albatross, Appias paulina

genus: Belenois

- Belenois java

genus: Catopsilia

- Yellow migrant, Catopsilia gorgophone
- Lemon migrant, Catopsilia pomona
- White migrant, Catopsilia pyranthe

genus: Cepora

- Caper gull, Cepora perimale

genus: Delias

- Delias aganippe
- Imperial Jezebel, Delias harpalyce
- Black Jezebel, Delias nigrina
- Yellow-spotted Jezebel, Delias nysa

genus: Elodina

- Narrow-winged pearl-white, Elodina padusa

genus: Eurema

- Small grass-yellow, Eurema smilax

genus: Pieris

- Small white, Pieris rapae

== Lycaenidae ==
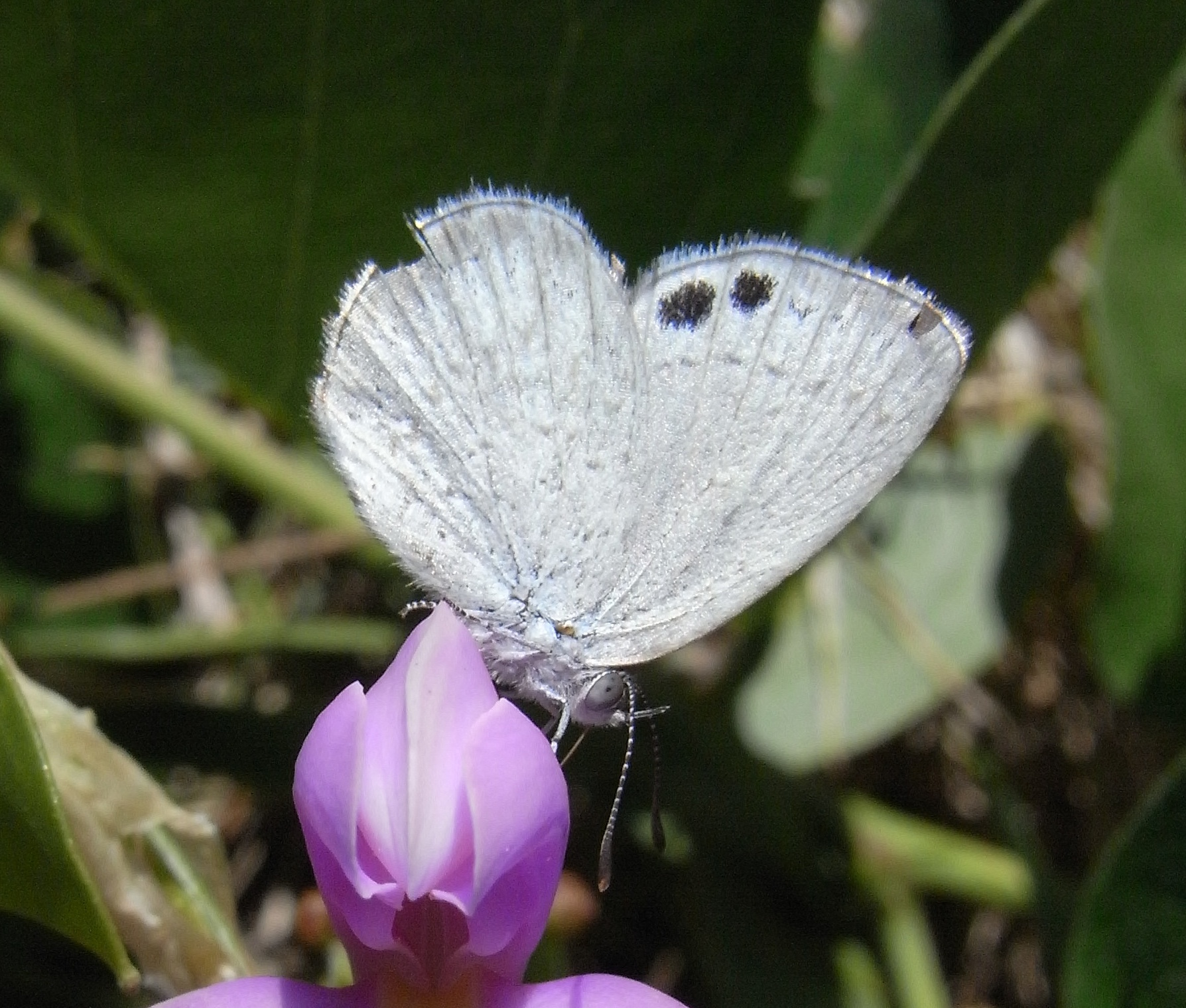
Varied dusky-blue

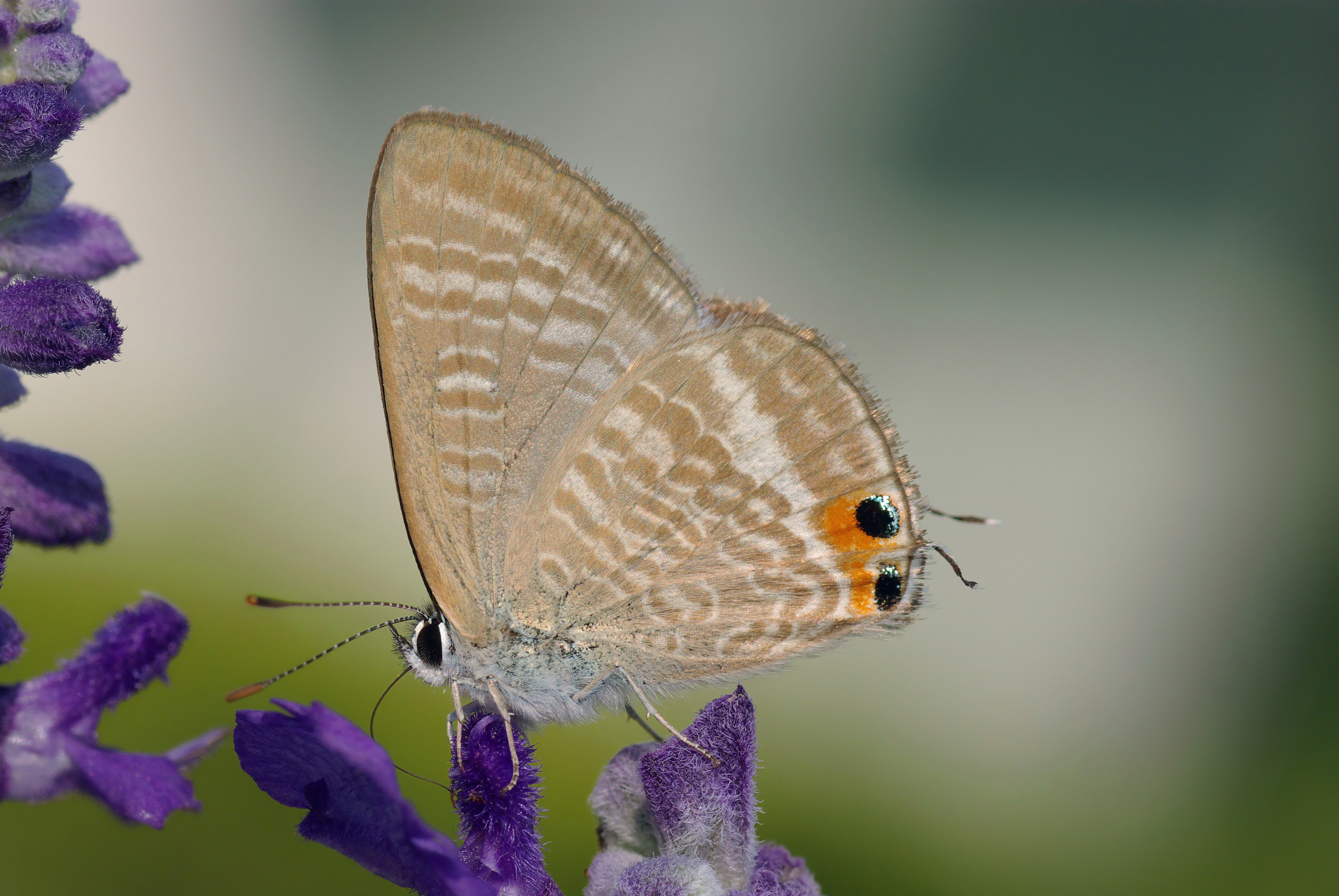
Long-tailed pea-blue

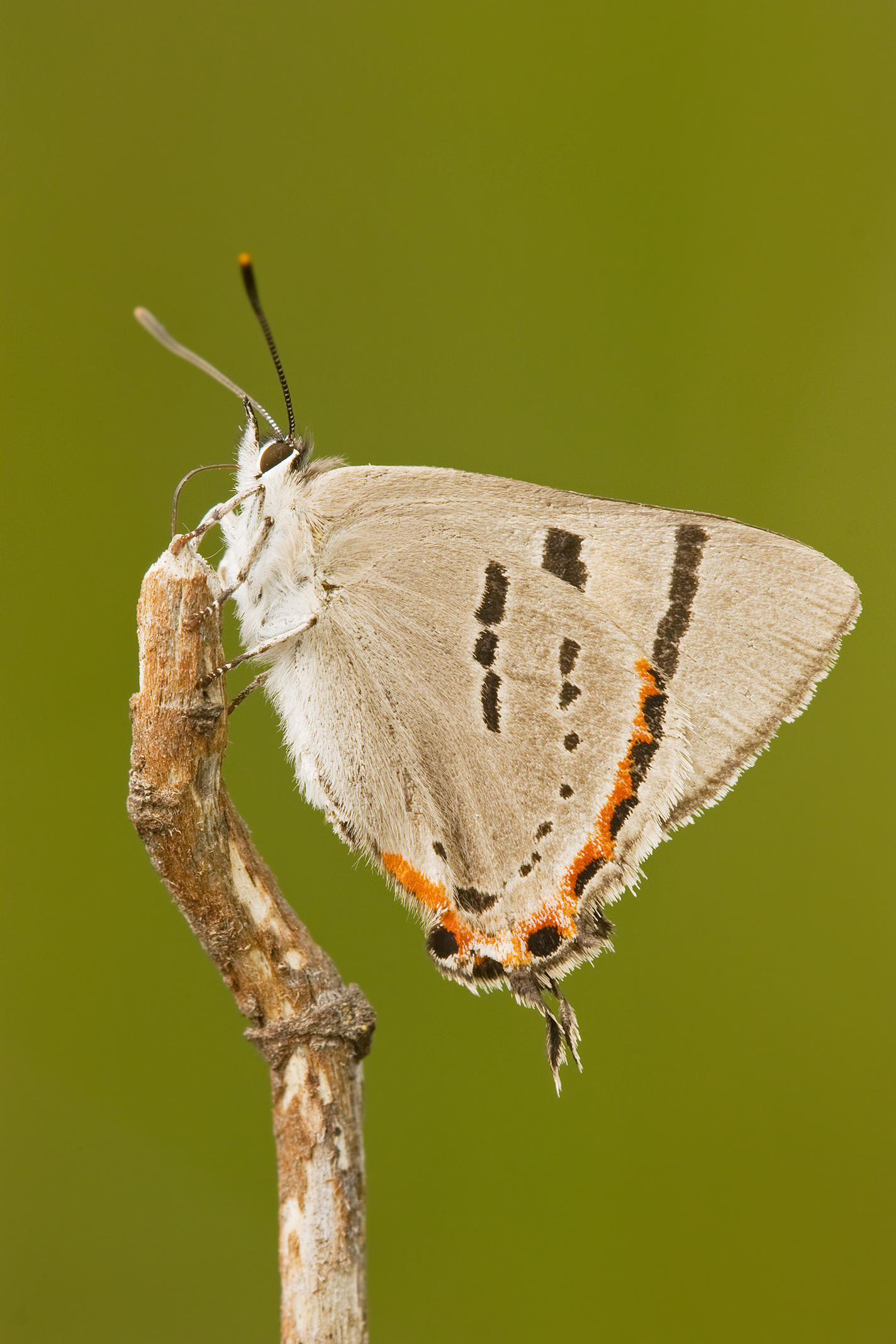
Silky hairstreak

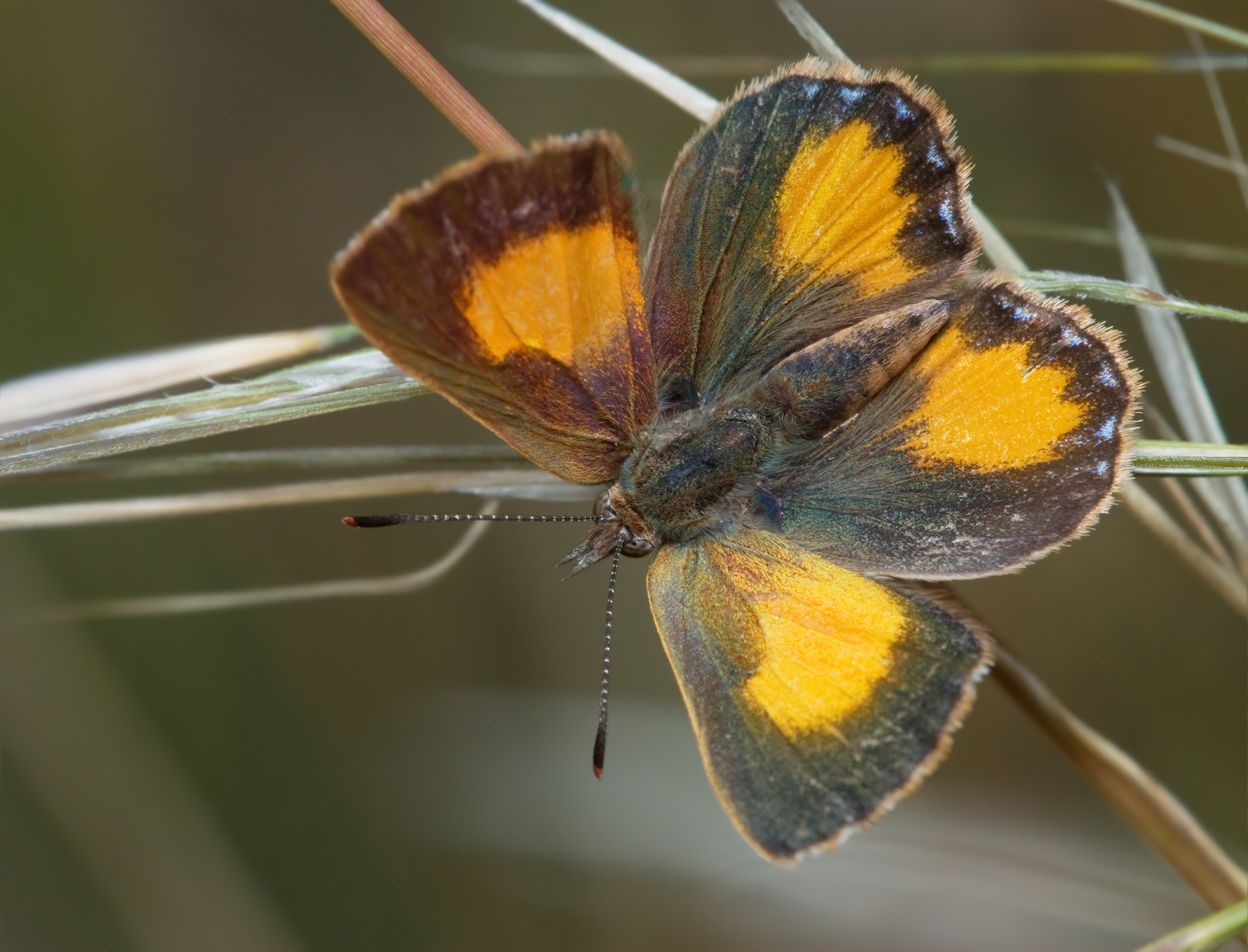
Bright copper

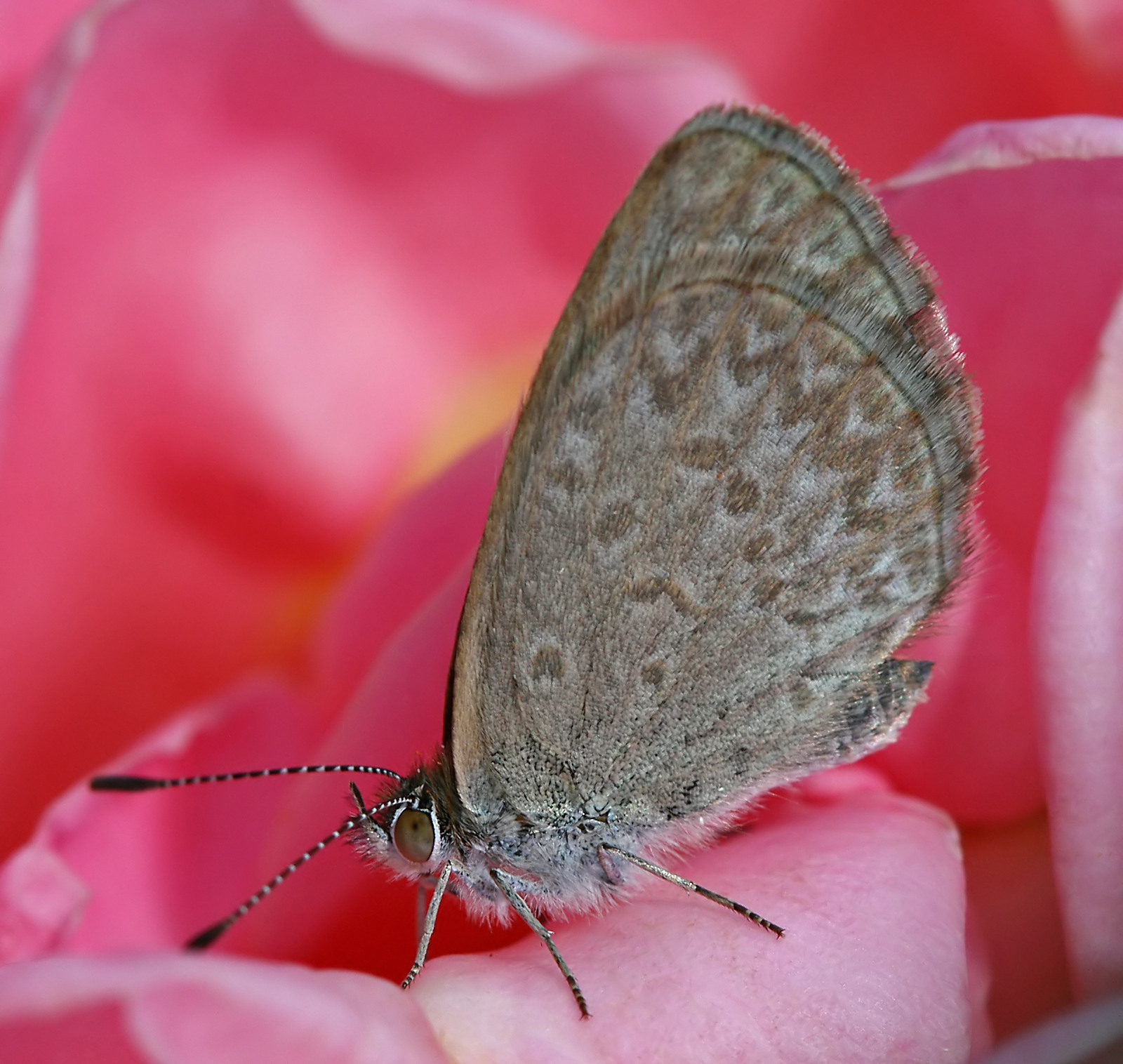
Common grass-blue

family: Lycaenidae (gossamer-winged blues and coppers) — 39 species

genus: Acrodipsas

- Acrodipsas aurata
- Bronze ant-blue, Acrodipsas brisbanensis
- Copper ant-blue, Acrodipsas cuprea
- Small ant-blue, Acrodipsas myrmecophila

genus: Candalides

- Common pencilled-blue, Candalides absimilis
- Blotched dusky-blue, Candalides acasta
- Dark pencilled-blue, Candalides consimilis
- Copper pencilled-blue, Candalides cyprotus
- Rayed blue, Candalides heathi

C. h. alpina
C. h. heathi

- Varied dusky-blue, Candalides hyacinthina

C. h. hyacinthina
C. h. josephina
C. h. simplexa

- Yellow-spotted blue, Candalides xanthospilos

genus: Hypochrysops

- Yellow jewel, Hypochrysops byzos
- Moonlight jewel, Hypochrysops delicia
- Fiery jewel, Hypochrysops ignita

genus: Jalmenus

- Imperial hairstreak, Jalmenus evagoras
- Amethyst hairstreak, Jalmenus icilius
- Stencilled hairstreak, Jalmenus ictinus

genus: Lampides

- Long-tailed pea-blue, Lampides boeticus

genus: Lucia

- Grassland copper, Lucia limbaria

genus: Nacaduba

- Two-spotted line-blue, Nacaduba biocellata

genus: Neolucia

- Fringed heath-blue, Neolucia agricola
- Montane heath-blue, Neolucia hobartensis
- Broom heath-blue, Neolucia mathewi

genus: Ogyris

- Dark-purple azure, Ogyris abrota
- Satin azure, Ogyris amaryllis
- Southern purple azure, Ogyris genoveva

O. g. araxes
O. g. duaringa

- Large bronze azure, Ogyris idmo
- Dull-purple azure, Ogyris olane
- Small bronze azure, Ogyris otanes
- Arid bronze azure, Ogyris subterrestris

genus: Paralucia

- Bright copper, Paralucia aurifera
- Dull copper, Paralucia pyrodiscus

genus: Pseudalmenus

- Silky hairstreak, Pseudalmenus chlorinda

P. c. fisheri
P. c. zephyrus

genus: Theclinesthes

- Bitter-bush blue, Theclinesthes albocincta
- Wattle blue, Theclinesthes miskini
- Salt-bush blue, Theclinesthes serpentata
- Saltpan blue, Theclinesthes sulpitius

genus: Zizeeria

- Spotted grass-blue, Zizeeria karsandra
- Common grass-blue, Zizina labradus

== Nymphalidae ==
family: Nymphalidae (brush– or four-footed) — 28 species

genus: Acraea

- Glasswing, Acraea andromacha

genus: Argynnina

- Argynnina cyrila

genus: Danaus

- Lesser wanderer, Danaus chrysippus
- Monarch butterfly, Danaus plexippus

genus: Euploea

- Common crow, Euploea core

genus: Geitoneura

- Ringed xenica, Geitoneura acantha
- Marbled xenica, Geitoneura klugii

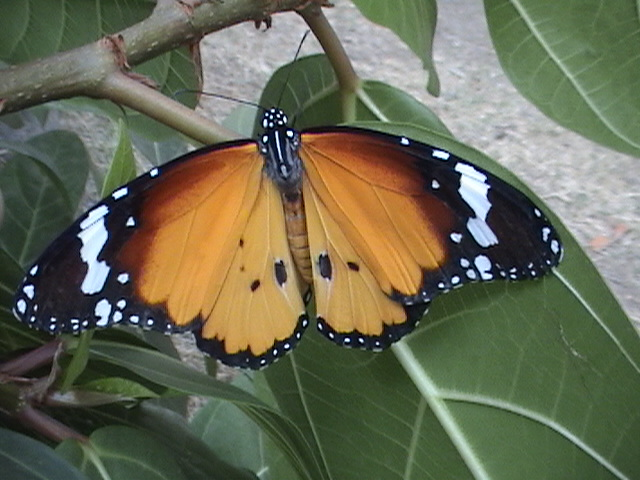
Plain tiger

genus: Heteronympha

- Heteronympha banksii

H. b. banksii
H. b. nevina

- Bright-eyed brown, Heteronympha cordace

H. c. cordace
H. c. wilsoni

- Common brown, Heteronympha merope
- Wonder brown, Heteronympha mirifica
- Spotted brown, Heteronympha paradelpha
- Shouldered brown, Heteronympha penelope

H. p. alope
H. p. maraia
H. p. sterope

- Solander's brown, Heteronympha solandri

H. s. angela
H. s. solandri

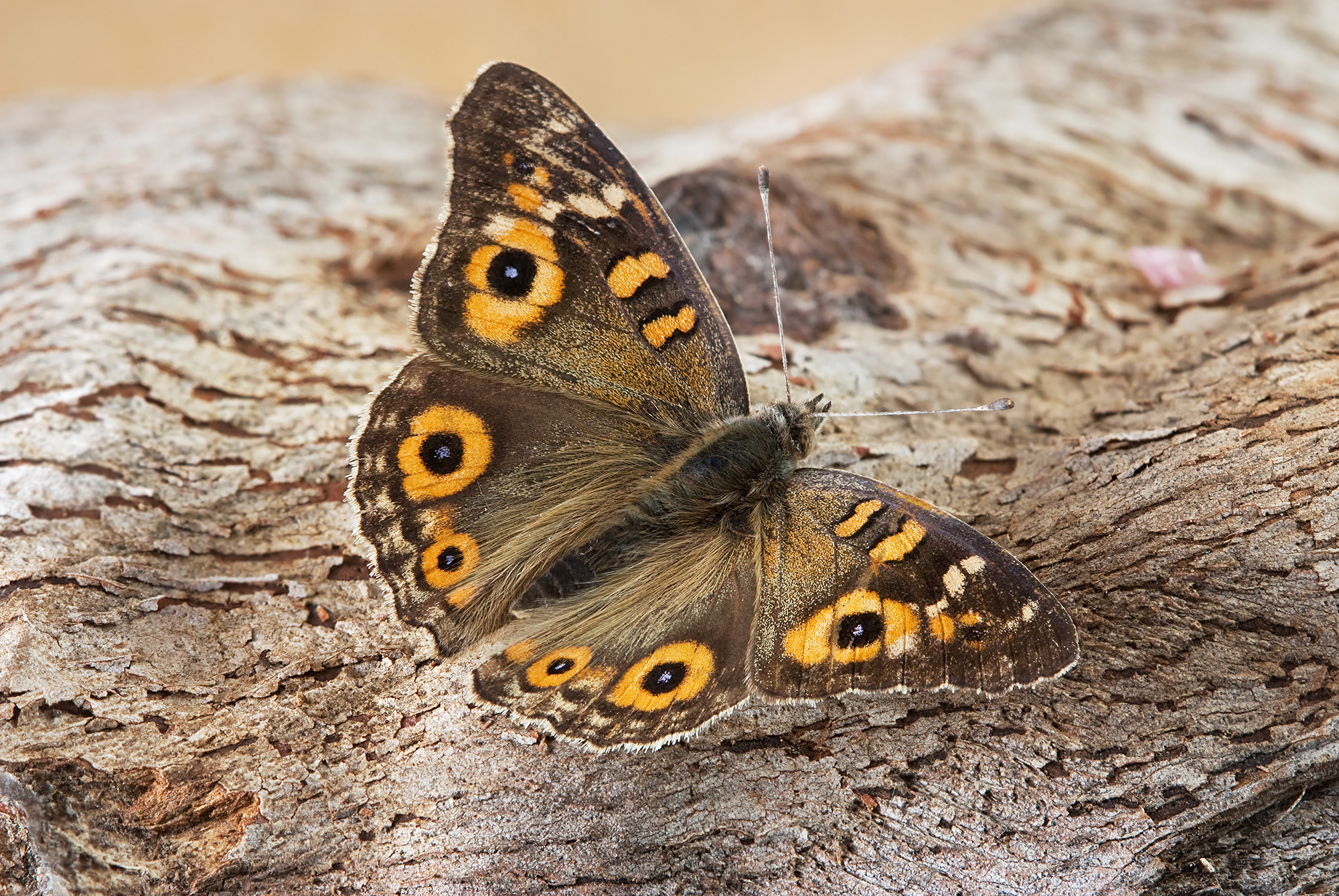
Meadow argus

genus: Hypocysta

- Rock ringlet, Hypocysta euphemia

genus: Hypolimnas

- Varied eggfly, Hypolimnas bolina

genus: Junonia

- Meadow argus, Junonia villida

genus: Oreixenica

- Orange alpine xenica, Oreixenica correae
- Striped xenica, Oreixenica kershawi

O. k. kanunda
O. k. kershawi

- Silver xenica, Oreixenica lathoniella
- Small alpine xenica, Oreixenica latialis

O. l. latialis
O. l. theddora

- Spotted alpine xenica, Oreixenica orichora

genus: Polyura

- Tailed emperor, Polyura sempronius

genus: Tirumala

- Tirumala hamata

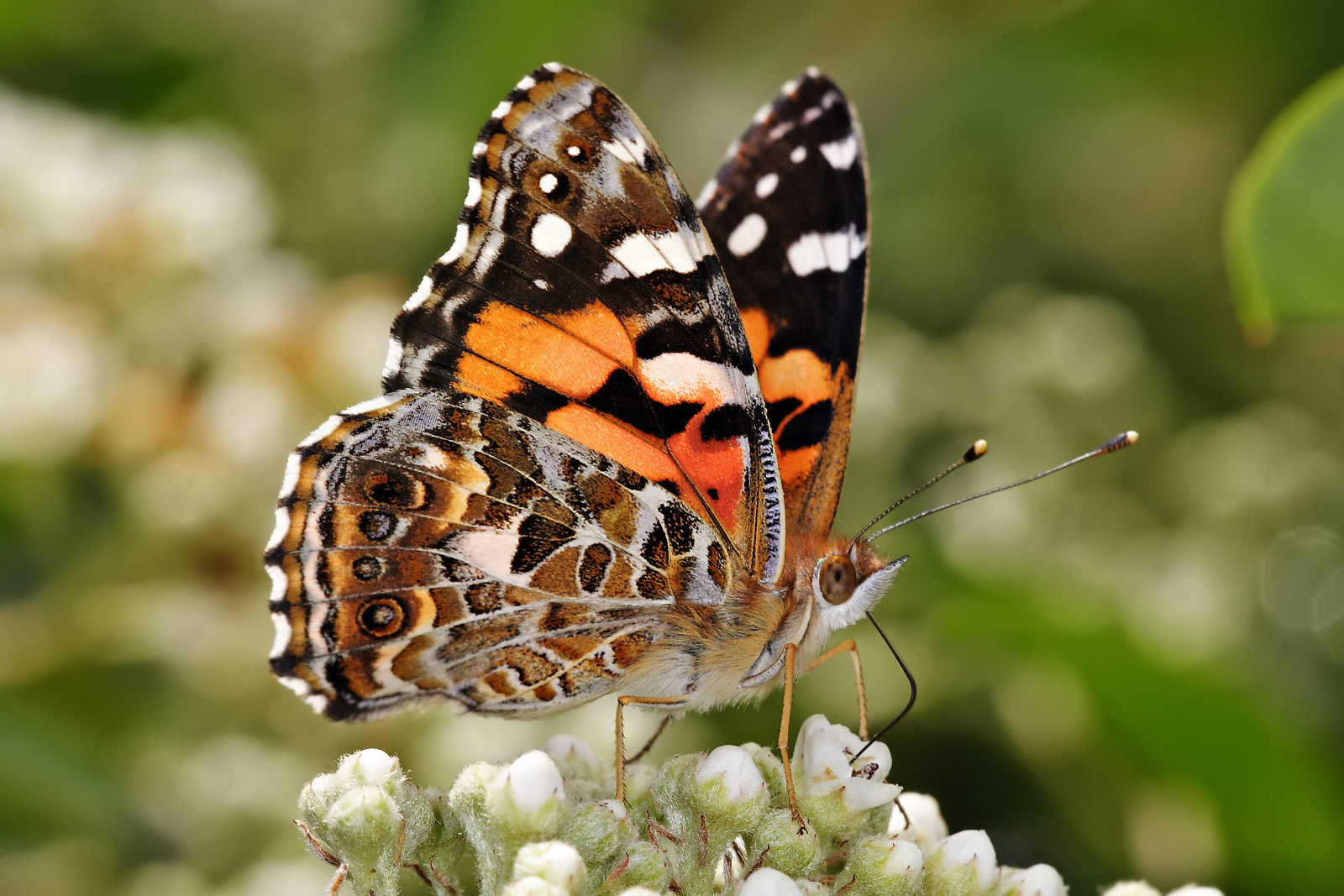
Australian painted lady

genus: Tisiphone

- Tisiphone abeona

T. a. albifascia
T. a. antoni

genus: Vanessa

- Yellow admiral, Vanessa itea
- Australian painted lady, Vanessa kershawi

genus: Ypthima

- Dusky knight, Ypthima arctous

== Hesperiidae ==
family: Hesperiidae (skippers) — 40 species

genus: Anisynta

- Mottled grass-skipper, Anisynta cynone
- Two-brand grass-skipper, Anisynta dominula
- Montane grass-skipper, Anisynta monticolae

genus: Antipodia

- Antipodia atralba
- Antipodia chaostola

genus: Badamia

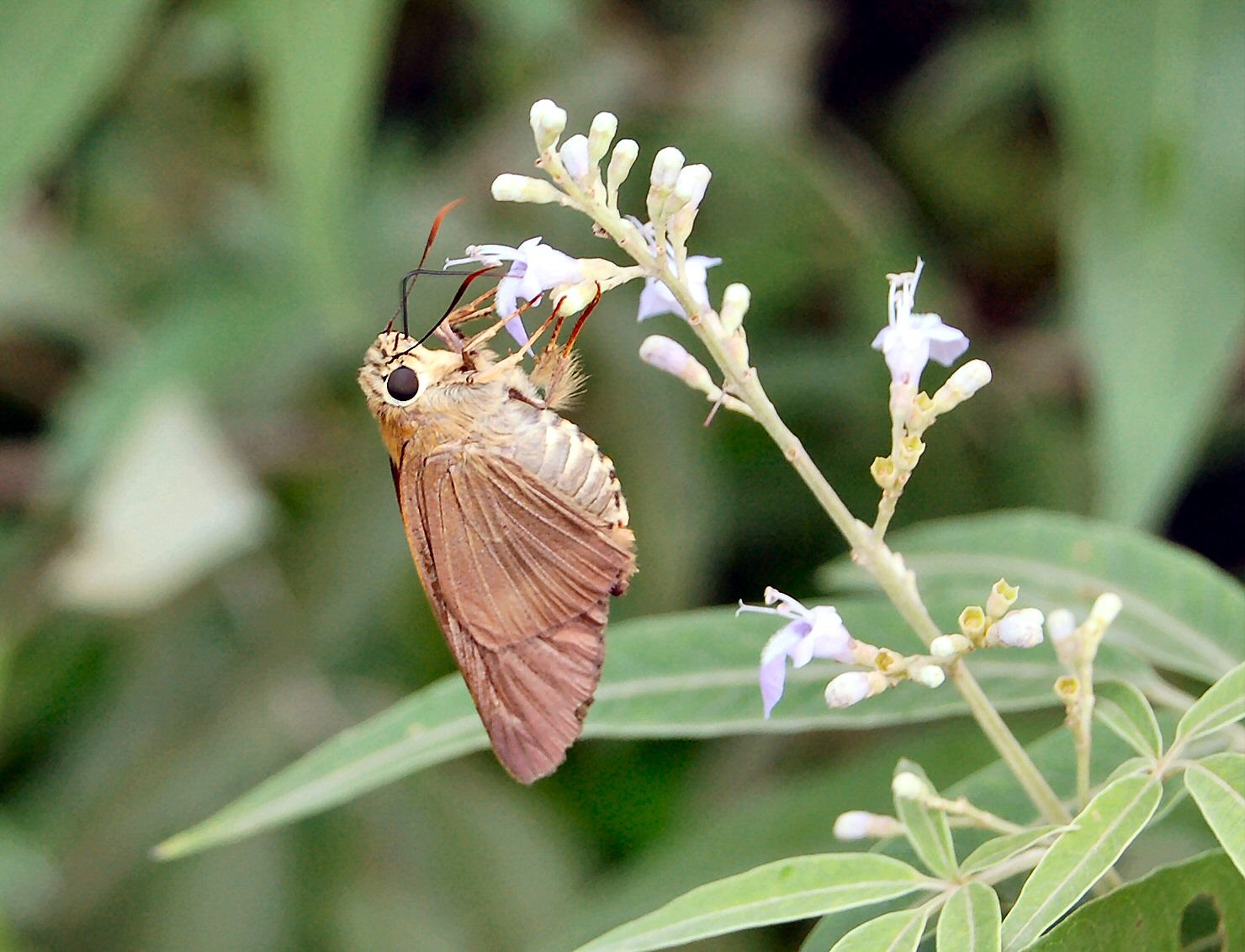
Brown awl

- Narrow-winged awl, Badamia exclamationis

genus: Cephrenes

- Orange palm dart, Cephrenes augiades
- Yellow palm dart, Cephrenes trichopepla

genus: Dispar

- Barred skipper, Dispar compacta

genus: Hesperilla

- Hesperilla chrysotricha

H. c. cyclospila
H. c. leucosia

- Hesperilla crypsargyra
- Hesperilla donnysa

H. d. delos
H. d. patmos

- Hesperilla flavescens
- Hesperilla idothea

H. i. clara
H. i. idothea n

- Hesperilla mastersi
- Hesperilla ornata
- Hesperilla picta

genus: Mesodina

- Mesodina halyzia
- Motasingha trimaculata

genus: Netrocoryne

- Netrocoryne repanda

genus: Oreisplanus

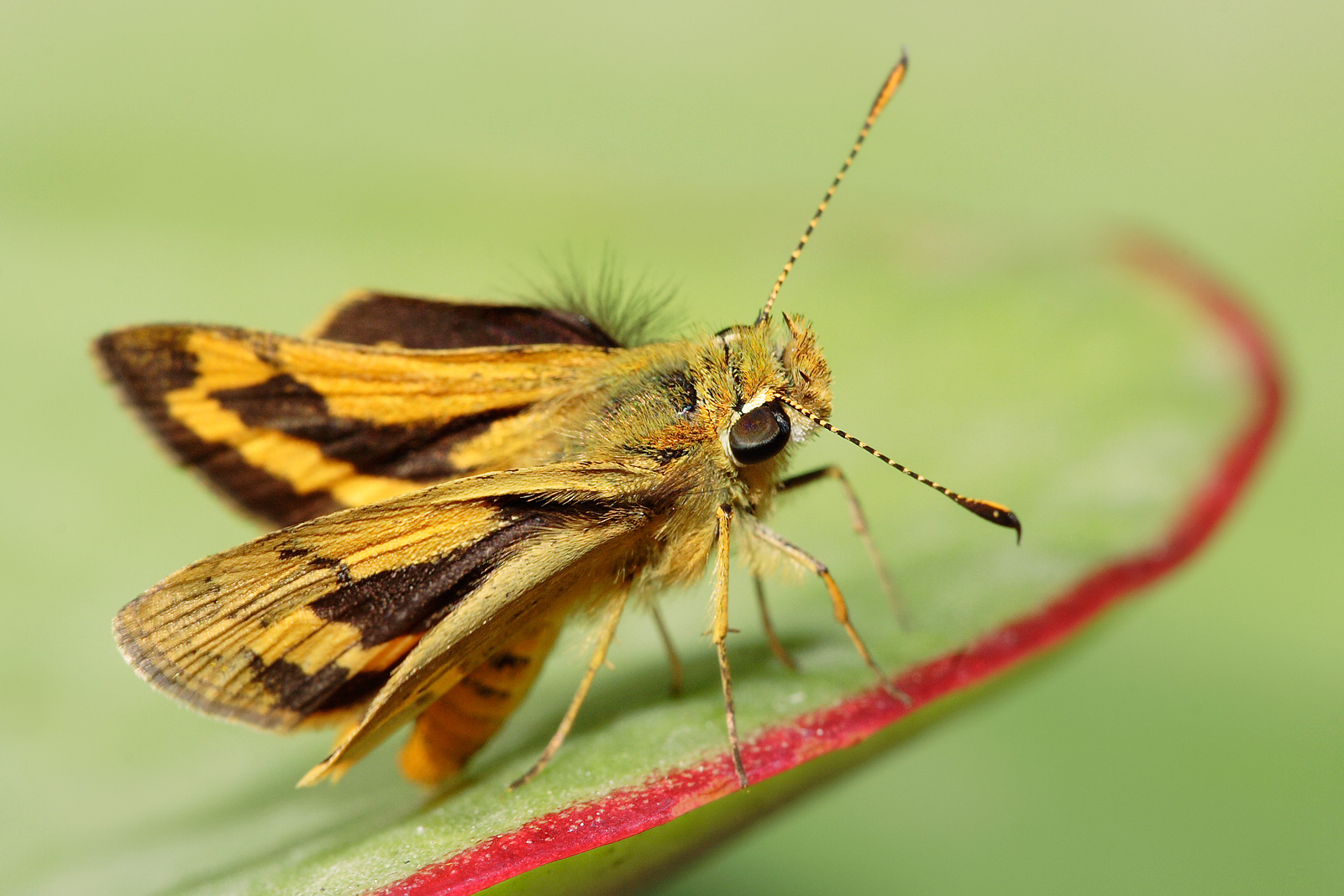
Green grass-dart

- Green grass-dart, Ocybadistes walkeri
- Oreisplanus munionga
- Oreisplanus perornata

genus: Pasma

- Pasma tasmanicus

genus: Signeta

- Signeta flammeata

genus: Suniana

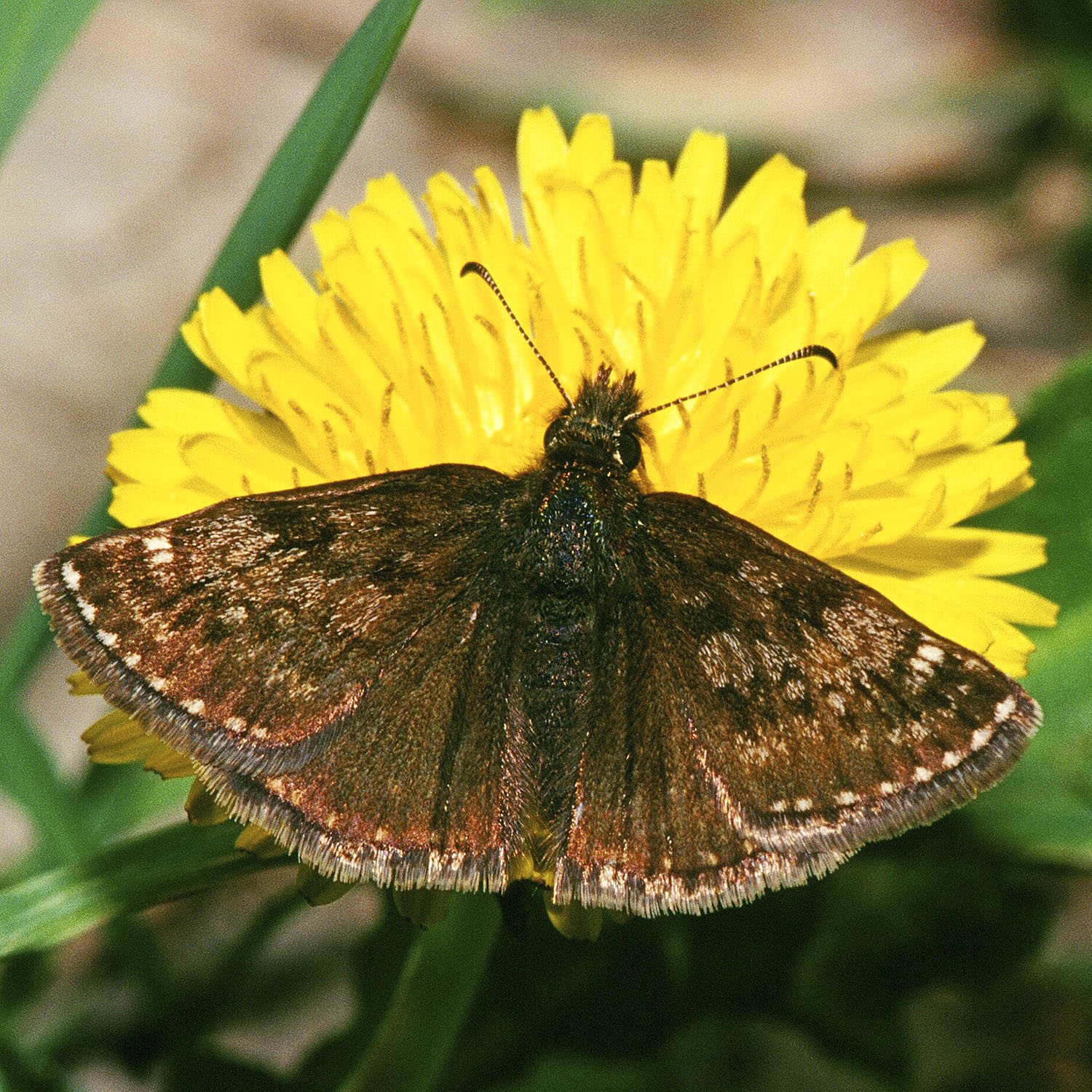
Dingy skipper

- Suniana lascivia

genus: Taractrocera

- Taractrocera papyria

genus: Anisynta

- Sedge darter, Telicota eurotas

genus: Toxidia

- Toxidia andersoni
- Toxidia doubledayi
- Toxidia parvulus
- Toxidia peron

genus: Trapezites

- Orange ochre, Trapezites eliena
- Silver-studded ochre, Trapezites iacchoides
- Yellow ochre, Trapezites lutea
- Heath ochre, Trapezites phigalia
- Montane ochre, Trapezites phigalioides
- Southern silver ochre, Trapezites praxedes
- Trapezites sciron
- Splendid ochre, Trapezites symmomus

T. s. soma
T. s. symmomus

== See also ==
- List of butterflies of Australia
- List of butterflies of Tasmania
