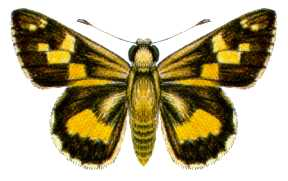

Scientific classification
- Kingdom: Animalia
- Phylum: Arthropoda
- Class: Insecta
- Order: Lepidoptera
- Family: Hesperiidae
- Genus: Trapezites
- Species: T. phigalioides

Binomial name
- Trapezites phigalioides Waterhouse, 1903

Synonyms
- Trapezites maheta phigalioides Waterhouse, 1903

= Trapezites phigalioides =

Species of butterfly

Trapezites phigalioides, commonly known as the montane ochre or phigalioides skipper, is a species of butterfly in the family Hesperiidae. It is endemic to Australia, where it occurs in New South Wales, Australian Capital Territory, Queensland and Victoria. It occurs primarily in open eucalypt forests, usually above 300 m (980 ft) altitude, extending up to 1,400 m (4,600 ft) altitude in subalpine woodland habitat in parts of New South Wales. The range of this species largely overlaps with the closely related heath ocre (Trapezites phigalia).

== Description ==
Trapezites phigalioides adults are brown above and grey below with yellow or orange markings on the wings and a wingspan of approximately 30 mm (1.2 in). From above, the forewings each exhibit three large yellow spots, a median yellow spot near the dorsum, a yellow dorsum streak, and a subapical band consisting of three pale yellow spots, while the hindwings each exhibit a single large band near the center of the hindwing. From below, the forewings exhibit markings similar to those above, while the hingwings exhibit roughly 12 small brown circular markings. Adult males and females appear similar. Eggs are dome shaped, white to cream in colour, measuring approximately 1.3 mm (0.051 in) in diameter with up to 20 longitudinal ribs. Larvae are pinkish-brown or pinkish-grey with a dark brown head, measuring up to 26 mm (1.0 in) in length depending on instar. Pupae are brown with dark brown spots, covered with a waxy grey powder, measuring approximately 20 mm (0.79 in) in length.

== Behaviour and life cycle ==
Adults fly fast and close to the ground, readily feeding at flowers. Adult males engage in hilltopping and establish territories within a meter of the ground. Adult females lay their eggs singly on the undersides of the leaves of the species' host plant, the wattle mat-rush (Lomandra filiformis). Once hatched, the larvae construct a vertical shelter from silk and debris at the base of the host plant, resting in their shelter during the day and emerging to feed at night. Pupation occurs inside the larval shelter, with the head of the larva oriented upwards. There is a single generation each year, with adults emerging primarily in November and December.
