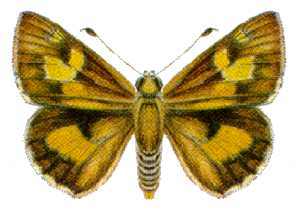

Scientific classification
- Kingdom: Animalia
- Phylum: Arthropoda
- Class: Insecta
- Order: Lepidoptera
- Family: Hesperiidae
- Genus: Trapezites
- Species: T. heteromacula

Binomial name
- Trapezites heteromacula Meyrick & Lower, 1902

Synonyms
- Trapezites heliomacula

= Trapezites heteromacula =

Species of butterfly

Trapezites heteromacula, the orange white-spot skipper, is a butterfly of the family Hesperiidae. It is found on Australia's Cape York.

The wingspan is about 30 mm.

The larvae feed on Lomandra filiformis and Lomandra longifolia.
