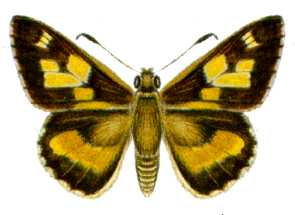

Scientific classification
- Kingdom: Animalia
- Phylum: Arthropoda
- Class: Insecta
- Order: Lepidoptera
- Family: Hesperiidae
- Genus: Trapezites
- Species: T. iacchoides

Binomial name
- Trapezites iacchoides Waterhouse, 1903

Synonyms
- Trapezites maheta iacchoides Waterhouse, 1903

= Trapezites iacchoides =

Species of butterfly endemic to Australia

Trapezites iacchoides, commonly known as the silver studded ochre or iacchoides skipper, is a species of butterfly in the family Hesperiidae. It is endemic to Australia, where it occurs in New South Wales, Queensland and Victoria. It inhabits cool, temperate, open eucalypt forests.

== Description ==
Trapezites iacchoides adults are brown above and pinkish-grey below with yellow or orange markings on the wings and a wingspan of approximately 36 mm (1.4 in). From above, the forewings each exhibit a large yellow spot in the cell, two yellow postmedian spots, a yellow median spot near the dorsum, a yellow streak along the dorsum towards the base and a band of three small yellow subapical spots, while the hindwings each exhibit a single large orange-yellow patch. From below, the forewings are an unmarked brown on the lower half of the wing with the upper half exhibiting yellow markings as above, while the hindwings are a brownish-grey with 9 silvery-white spots edged with brown. Adult males and females appear similar. Eggs are dome shaped, cream in colour, measuring approximately 1.4 mm (0.055 in) in diameter with 19-21 longitudinal ribs. Larvae are pale grey-green to brown with a dark brown head marked with two pale brown spots and two pale median stripes. Pupae are pale brown, covered with a waxy white powder, measuring up to 23 mm (0.91 in) with a short bi-lobed lateral projection on the head.

== Behaviour and life cycle ==
Adults fly fast and close to the ground. Under sunny conditions adult males engage in hilltopping. Adult females tend to remain close to their breeding areas, laying their eggs singly on the leaves of the species' host plant, the spiny-headed mat rush (Lomandra longifolia). Once hatched, the larvae construct a vertical shelter from silk and dead leaves near the base of the host plant, resting in their shelter during the day and emerging to feed at night. Larvae overwinter inside their larval shelters. Pupation occurs inside the larval shelter, head pointing upwards. There is a single generation each year, with adults emerging primarily in October and November.
