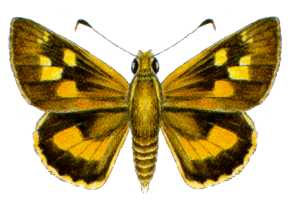

Scientific classification
- Kingdom: Animalia
- Phylum: Arthropoda
- Class: Insecta
- Order: Lepidoptera
- Family: Hesperiidae
- Genus: Trapezites
- Species: T. eliena

Binomial name
- Trapezites eliena Hewitson, 1868

Synonyms
- Hesperia eliena Hewitson, 1868; Telesto caecilius Plötz, 1884; Trapezites eliena monocycla Lower, 1911

= Trapezites eliena =

Species of butterfly

Trapezites eliena, commonly known as the orange ochre or eliena skipper, is a species of butterfly in the family Hesperiidae. It is endemic to Australia, where it occurs in Australian Capital Territory, New South Wales, Queensland, South Australia, and Victoria. It inhabits coastal or montane eucalypt forests.

== Description ==
Trapezites eliena adults are brown above and pinkish-brown below with yellow or orange markings on the wings and a wingspan of 33–37 mm (1.3–1.5 in). From above, the forewings each exhibit a rectangular yellow blotch in the cell, two yellow postmedian spots, a yellow spot near the dorsum, an orange-yellow streak along the dorsum to the base of the wing and a subapical band of three small yellow spots, while the hindwings each exhibit a broad central orange band. From below, the forewings each exhibit a dark brown central area to the dorsum and base of the wing with yellow markings similar to those seen above, while the hindwings each exhibit a central silver spot edged in black and four small white-centered brown postmedian spots. Eggs are dome shaped, white or cream in colour developing irregular red bands over time, measuring approximately 1.2 mm (0.047 in) in diameter with 19-20 longitudinal ribs. Larvae are pinkish-brown to greyish-green with faint brown stripes and scattered small brown spots, measuring up to 36 mm (1.4 in) in length. Pupae are brown and mottled with darker brown spots, measuring approximately 20 mm (0.79 in) in length.

== Behaviour and life cycle ==
Adults fly fast and close to the ground, frequently landing on rocks and foliage. Adult males engage in hilltopping and will defend their established territory from other males. Adult females lay their eggs singly on the species' host plants, which include several species of mat-rushes: Lomandra confertifolia, Lomandra filiformis, Lomandra longifolia, and Lomandra multiflora. Once hatched, larvae construct a shelter from silk and dead leaves, resting in their shelter during the day and emerging to feed at night. Larvae overwinter inside their larval shelters. Pupation occurs inside the larval shelter, typically near the base of the host plant. There is likely only a single generation each year with adults emerging primarily between November and January, though adults have been recorded from October to March.
