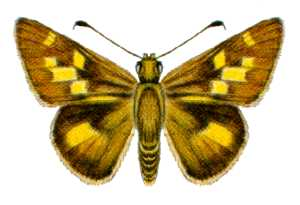

Scientific classification
- Kingdom: Animalia
- Phylum: Arthropoda
- Class: Insecta
- Order: Lepidoptera
- Family: Hesperiidae
- Genus: Trapezites
- Species: T. petalia

Binomial name
- Trapezites petalia Hewitson, 1868

Synonyms
- Hesperia petalia; Telesto megalopis

= Trapezites petalia =

Species of butterfly

Trapezites petalia, the common white spot skipper or black-ringed ochre, is a butterfly of the family Hesperiidae. It is found in the Australian states of Queensland and New South Wales.

The wingspan is about 30 mm.

The larvae feed on Lomandra filiformis, Lomandra longifolia and Lomandra multiflora.
