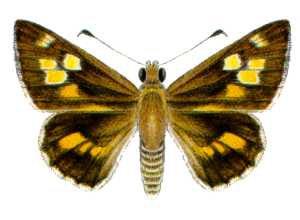

Scientific classification
- Kingdom: Animalia
- Phylum: Arthropoda
- Class: Insecta
- Order: Lepidoptera
- Family: Hesperiidae
- Genus: Trapezites
- Species: T. iacchus

Binomial name
- Trapezites iacchus (Fabricius, 1775)

Synonyms
- Papilio iacchus

= Trapezites iacchus =

Species of butterfly

Trapezites iacchus, the Iacchus skipper, is a butterfly of the family Hesperiidae. It is found in the Australian states of New South Wales and Queensland.

The wingspan is about 30 mm.

The larvae feed on Lomandra hystrix, Lomandra longifolia and Lomandra multiflora.
