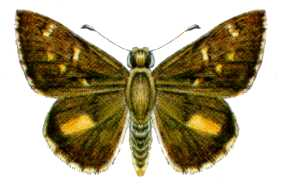

Scientific classification
- Kingdom: Animalia
- Phylum: Arthropoda
- Class: Insecta
- Order: Lepidoptera
- Family: Hesperiidae
- Genus: Trapezites
- Species: T. sciron

Binomial name
- Trapezites sciron Waterhouse & Lyell, 1914

Synonyms
- Trapezites eremicola

= Trapezites sciron =

Species of butterfly

Trapezites sciron, the Sciron skipper, is a butterfly of the family Hesperiidae. It is found in the Australian states of Western Australia, South Australia and Victoria.

The wingspan is about 30 mm.

The larvae feed on Acanthocarpus canaliculatus, Acanthocarpus preissii, Lomandra caespitosa and Lomandra collina.

== Subspecies ==
- Trapezites sciron eremicola (Victoria and South Australia)
- Trapezites sciron sciron (Western Australia)
- Trapezites sciron atkinsi (south-west most tip of Western Australia)
