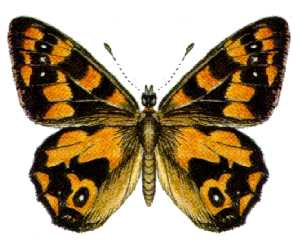

Scientific classification
- Domain: Eukaryota
- Kingdom: Animalia
- Phylum: Arthropoda
- Class: Insecta
- Order: Lepidoptera
- Family: Nymphalidae
- Genus: Argynnina
- Species: A. cyrila

Binomial name
- Argynnina cyrila Waterhouse & Lyell, 1914

Synonyms
- Xenica cyrila

= Argynnina cyrila =

Species of butterfly

Argynnina cyrila, or Cyril's brown, is a butterfly of the family Nymphalidae. It is found in Australia in southern Queensland, New South Wales, South Australia and Victoria.

The wingspan is about 40 mm.

The larvae feed on various grasses.
