= T. lutea =

T. lutea may refer to:

- Taperina lutea, a daddy longlegs
- Thalesia lutea, a broomrape native to North America
- Thunbergia lutea, an Old World plant
- Tigridia lutea, a South American plant
- Trapezia lutea, a guard crab
- Trapezites lutea, an Australian butterfly
- Trimezia lutea, a New World plant
- Tulipa lutea, a perennial plant
