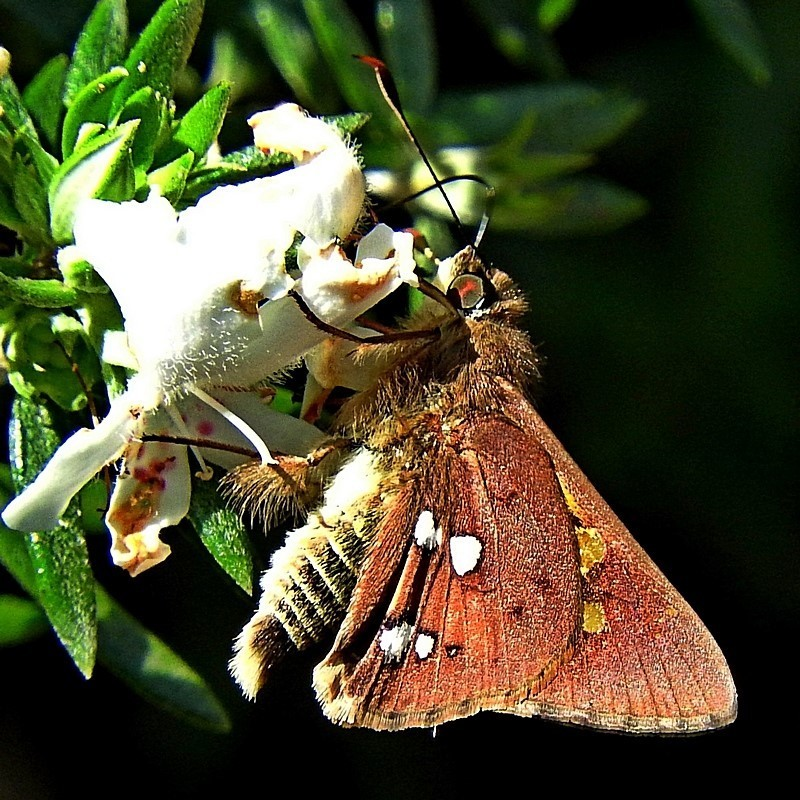

Scientific classification
- Kingdom: Animalia
- Phylum: Arthropoda
- Clade: Pancrustacea
- Class: Insecta
- Order: Lepidoptera
- Family: Hesperiidae
- Genus: Trapezites
- Species: T. praxedes

Binomial name
- Trapezites praxedes Plötz, 1884

Synonyms
- Telesto praxedes Plötz, 1884

= Trapezites praxedes =

Species of butterfly

Trapezites praxedes, commonly known as the southern silver ochre or praxedes skipper, is a species of butterfly in the family Hesperiidae. It is endemic to Australia, where it occurs in New South Wales, Queensland and Victoria.

== Description ==
Trapezites praxedes adults are brown above and purplish-brown below with yellow or orange markings on the wings and a wingspan of approximately 29 mm (1.1 in). From above, the forewings each exhibit three large yellow central spots, a median yellow spot near the dorsum and a band of three small yellow subapical spots, while the hindwings each exhibit a broad orange-yellow central band. From below, the forewings exhibit similar markings to those seen from above. The ventral surface of the hindwings exhibit sexual dichromatism: when viewed from below, males exhibit three large and several small silvery spots on the hindwings while the hindwings of females are marked with several brown rings instead. Eggs are dome shaped, cream to white in colour with irregular reddish-orange bands, measuring approximately 1.1 mm (0.043 in) in diameter with 18 longitudinal ribs. Larvae are reddish-brown with a faint brown middorsal line and a brown head with lighter spots, measuring up to 24 mm (0.94 in) in length. Pupae are pinkish-brown, marked with black dots and covered in a waxy white powder.

This species is extremely similar in appearance to Trapezites maheta and distinguishing between the two is difficult, even with pinned specimens.

== Behaviour and life cycle ==
Adults fly quickly, feeding readily at flowers close to the ground but also high in the canopy. Adult females lay their eggs singly on leaves at the base of the species' host plants, which include several species of mat-rushes: Lomandra confertifolia, Lomandra laxa, Lomandra longifolia, Lomandra obliqua, and Lomandra spicata. Once hatched, the larvae construct a shelter at the base of the host plant, resting in their shelter during the day and emerging to feed at night. Larvae overwinter inside their larval shelters. Pupation may occur inside the larval shelter or in a curled dead leaf near the base of the host plant. Adults emerge primarily in January, but have been recorded from September to May.
