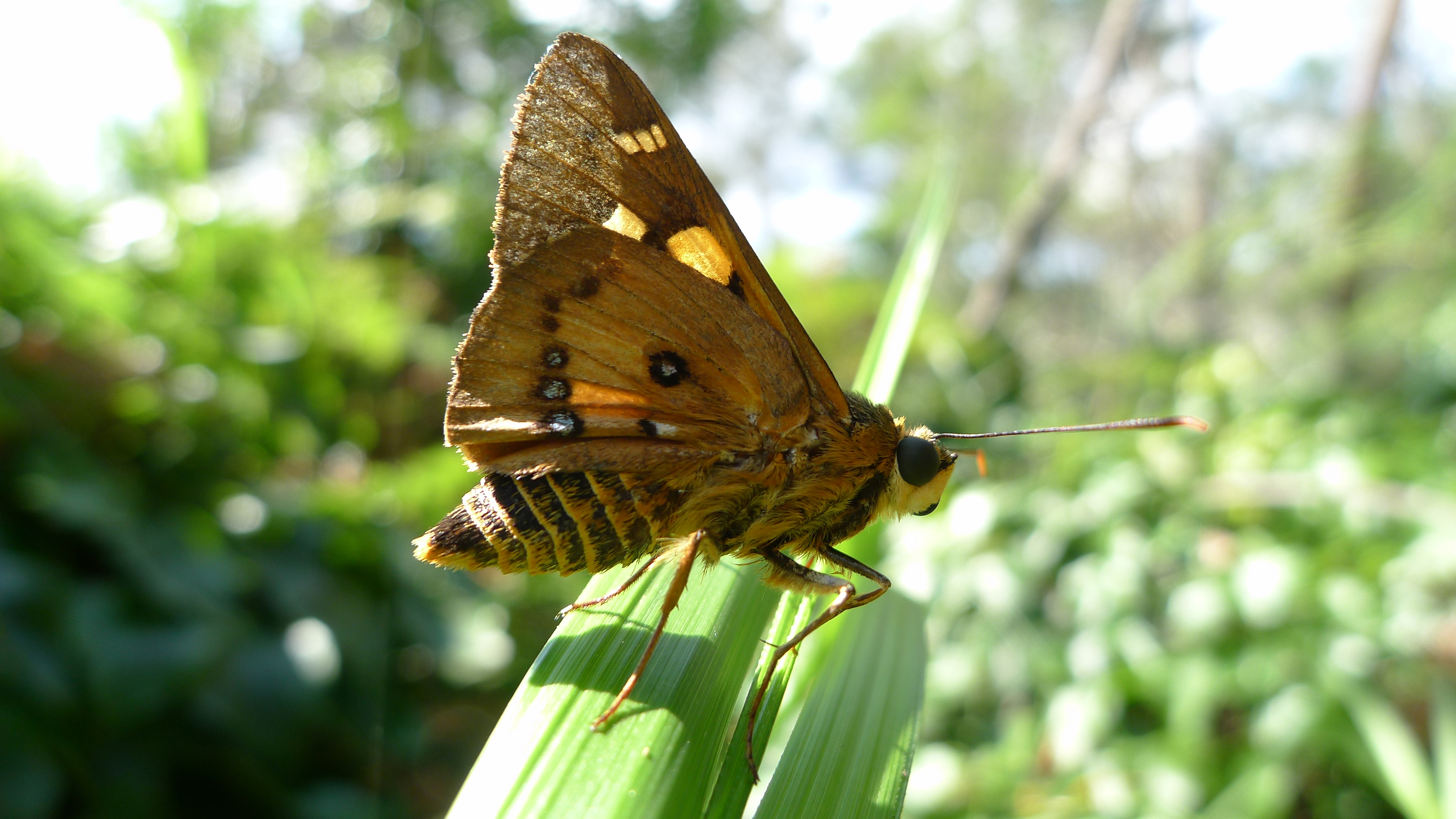

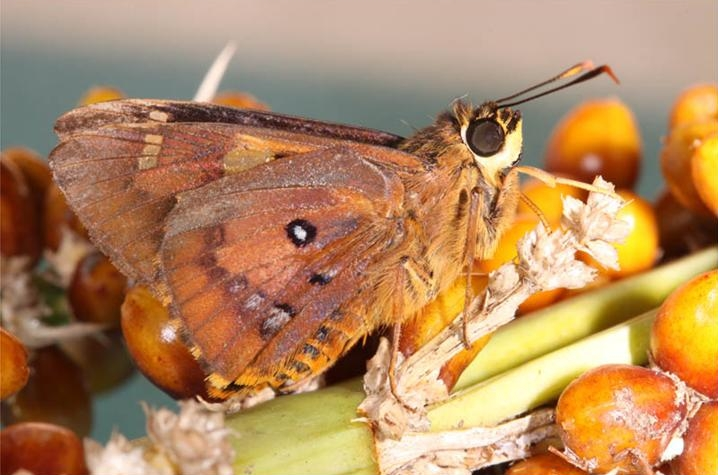

Scientific classification
- Kingdom: Animalia
- Phylum: Arthropoda
- Class: Insecta
- Order: Lepidoptera
- Family: Hesperiidae
- Genus: Trapezites
- Species: T. symmomus

Binomial name
- Trapezites symmomus Hübner, 1823

Synonyms
- Trapezites soma; Trapezites sombra

= Trapezites symmomus =

Species of butterfly

Trapezites symmomus is a butterfly of the family Hesperiidae. It is found in Queensland, Victoria, South Australia and New South Wales.

The wingspan is about 50 mm.

The larvae feed on Lomandra hystrix, Lomandra longifolia, Lomandra obliqua, Lomandra spicata and Romnalda strobilacea.

== Subspecies ==
- Trapezites symmomus sombra (Tablelands of northern Queensland)
- Trapezites symmomus sommomus (Southern Queensland and New South Wales)
- Trapezites symmomus soma (Victoria and South Australia)

== Gallery ==
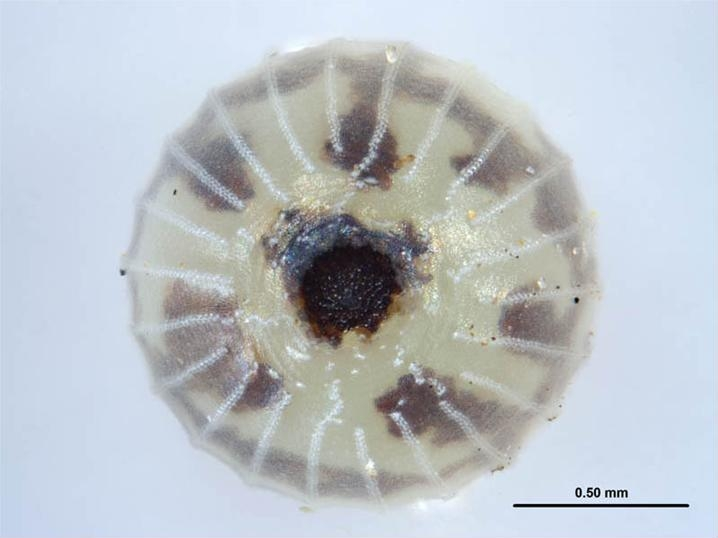
Egg, dorsal view

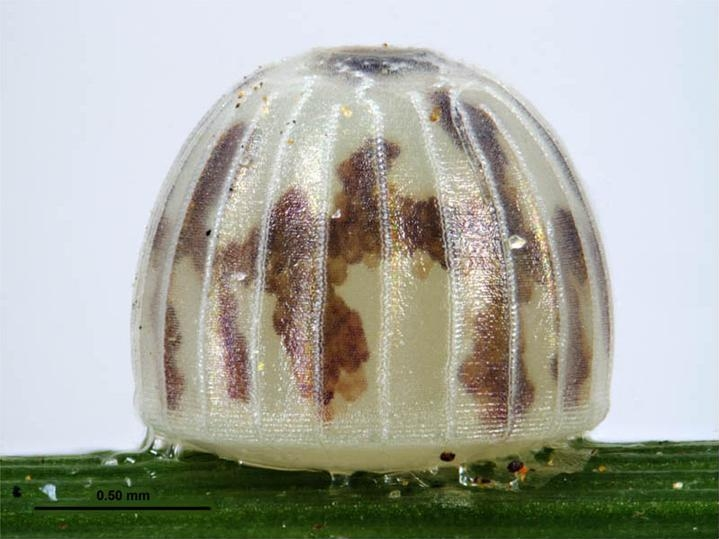
Egg, lateral view

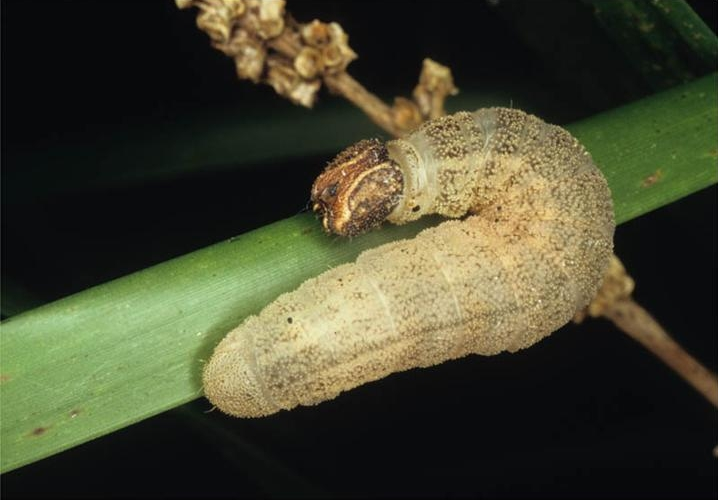
Larva

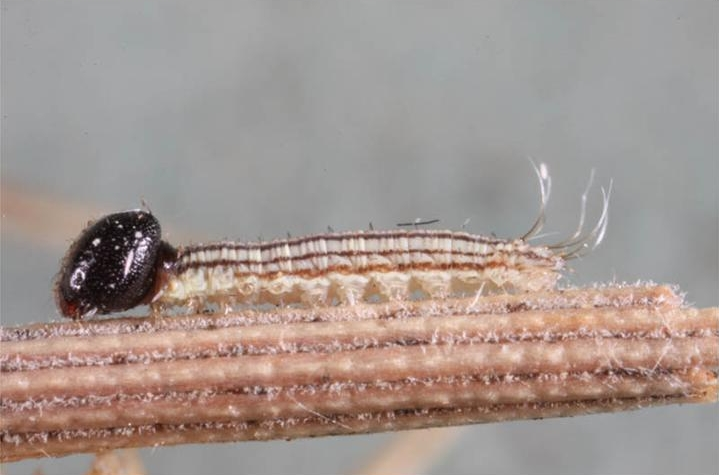
Larva

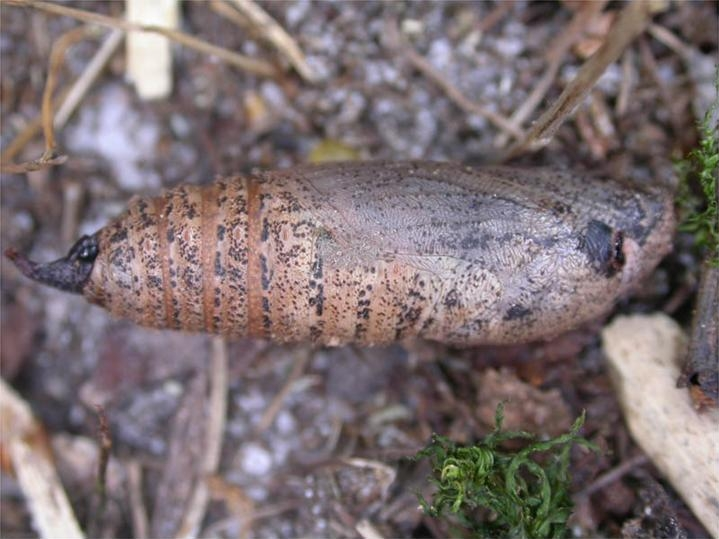
Pupa

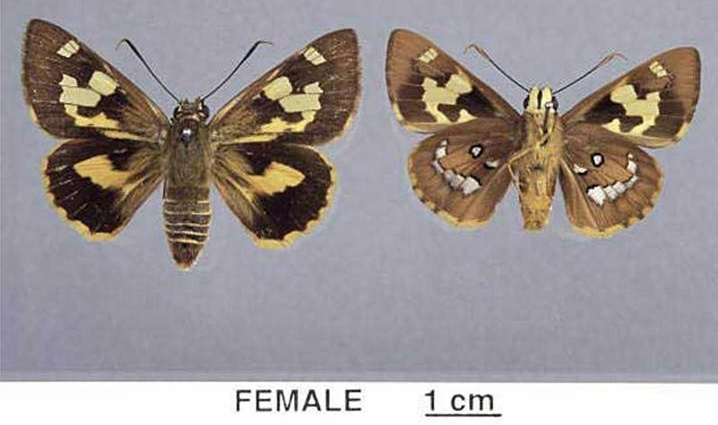
Mounted Female

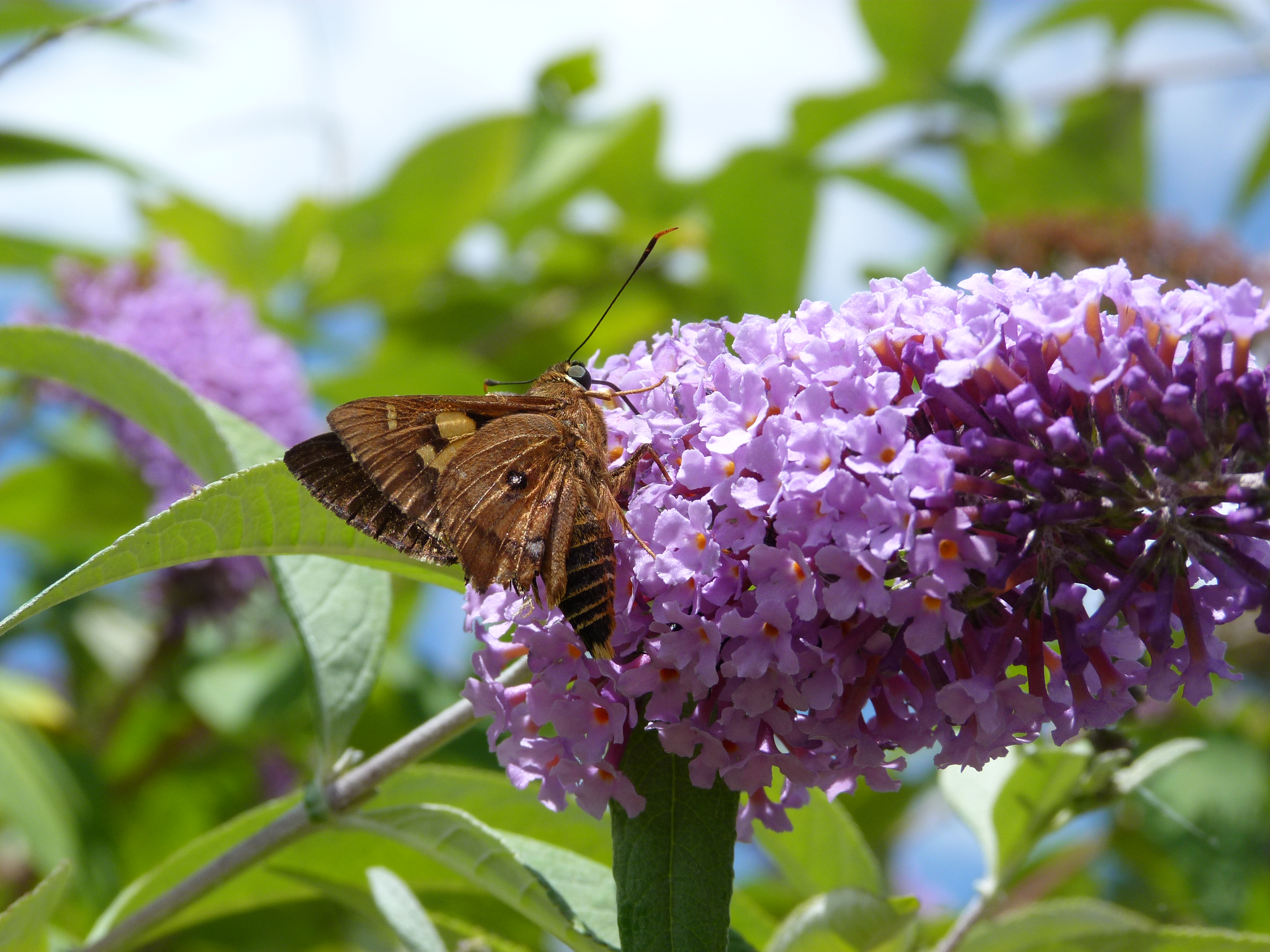
