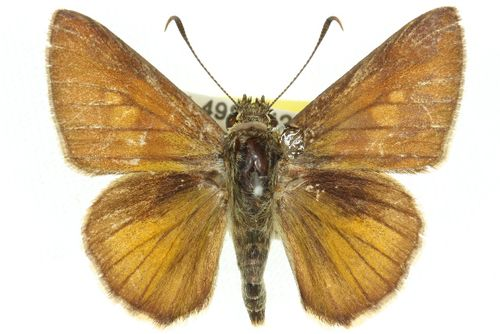

Scientific classification
- Kingdom: Animalia
- Phylum: Arthropoda
- Class: Insecta
- Order: Lepidoptera
- Family: Hesperiidae
- Genus: Trapezites
- Species: T. macqueeni

Binomial name
- Trapezites macqueeni Kerr & Sands, 1970

= Trapezites macqueeni =

Species of butterfly

Trapezites macqueeni, the Macqueen's skipper, is a butterfly of the family Hesperiidae. It is found in north Queensland, Australia, in the hills away from the coast.

The wingspan is about 30 mm.

The larvae feed on Lomandra filiformis.
