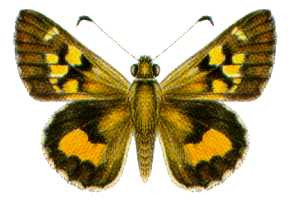

Scientific classification
- Kingdom: Animalia
- Phylum: Arthropoda
- Class: Insecta
- Order: Lepidoptera
- Family: Hesperiidae
- Genus: Trapezites
- Species: T. phigalia

Binomial name
- Trapezites phigalia Hewitson, 1868

Synonyms
- Hesperia phigalia Hewitson, 1868; Telesto phlaea Plötz, 1884; Trapezites phillyra Miskin, 1889; Trapezites phigalia phila Waterhouse, 1937

= Trapezites phigalia =

Species of butterfly endemic to Australia

Trapezites phigalia, commonly known as the heath ochre or phigalia skipper, is a species of butterfly in the family Hesperiidae. It is endemic to Australia, where it occurs in New South Wales, Queensland, South Australia and Victoria. It is primarily found in eucalypt woodlands, open forests, and coastal healthland habitats.

== Description ==
Trapezites phigalia adults are brown above and brownish-grey below with yellow or orange markings on the wings and a wingspan of approximately 30 mm (1.2 in). From above, the forewings each exhibit a black central area containing three yellow spots, a median yellow spot near the dorsum, and a subapical band of three pale spots, while the hindwings each exhibit a broad yellow-orange central band. From below, the forewings exhibit a central black patch and markings as above, while the hindwings are dotted with 10 brown circular markings, irregular in shape. Adult males and females appear similar, though the yellow spots on the wings are larger on females. Eggs are dome shaped, cream in colour, measuring approximately 1.2 mm (0.047 in) in diameter with approximately 21 longitudinal ribs. Larvae are pinkish-grey with a roughly-textured dark brown head, measuring up to 28 mm (1.1 in) in length depending on instar. Pupae are brown, covered with a waxy grey powder, measuring approximately 19 mm (0.75 in) in length.

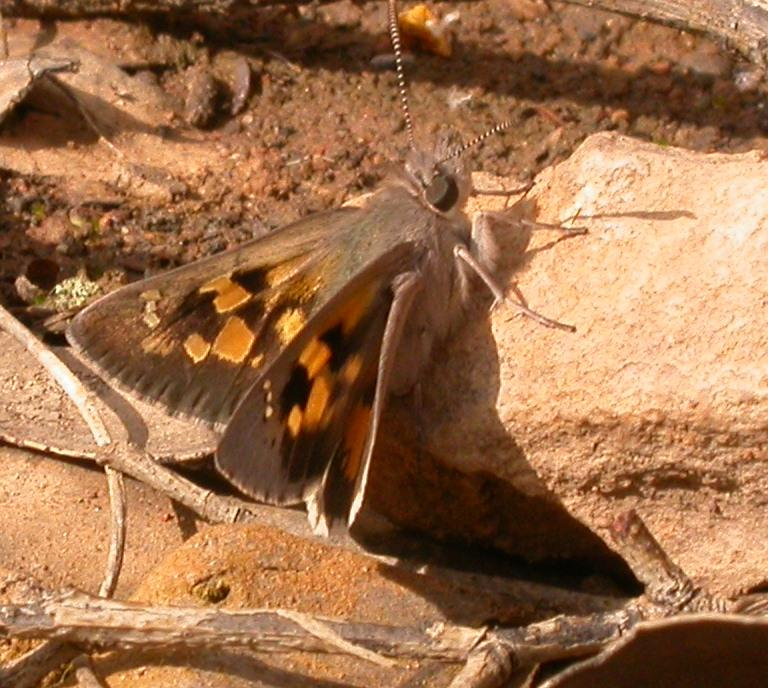
Adult perching

== Behaviour and life cycle ==
Adults fly fast and close to the ground, readily feeding at flowers. Adult males engage in hilltopping and establish territories within a meter of the ground. Adult females lay their eggs singly on the undersides of the leaves of the species' host plants, which include several species of mat-rushes: Lomandra densiflora, Lomandra fibrata, Lomandra filiformis, Lomandra glauca, Lomandra nana, and Lomandra obliqua. Once hatched, the larvae construct a vertical shelter from silk and debris at the base of the host plant, resting in their shelter during the day and emerging to feed at night. Larvae overwinter inside their larval shelters. Pupation may occur inside the larval shelter or in a curled dead leaf near the base of the host plant. There is a single generation each year, with adults emerging primarily in October and November.
