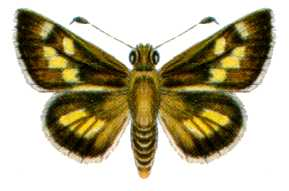

Scientific classification
- Kingdom: Animalia
- Phylum: Arthropoda
- Class: Insecta
- Order: Lepidoptera
- Family: Hesperiidae
- Genus: Trapezites
- Species: T. luteus

Binomial name
- Trapezites luteus Tepper, 1882

Synonyms
- Trapezites lutea Tepper, 1882; Hesperilla lutea; Trapezites glaucus; Trapezites leucon

= Trapezites luteus =

Species of butterfly

Trapezites luteus, the rare white spot skipper, is a butterfly of the family Hesperiidae. It is found in Australia in the states of New South Wales, Victoria, South Australia and Tasmania.

The wingspan is about 30 mm.

The larvae feed on Lomandra confertifolia, Lomandra densiflora, Lomandra filiformis, Lomandra longifolia and Lomandra multiflora.

== Subspecies ==
- Trapezites luteus luteus (On the slopes of the mountains of New South Wales, Victoria, South Australia)
- Trapezites luteus glaucus (Tasmania)
