= Joyce Winifred Vickery =

Australian botanist

Joyce Winifred Vickery (15 December 1908 – 29 May 1979) was an Australian botanist who specialised in taxonomy and became well known in Australia for forensic botany.

== Early life and education ==
Joyce was born in the Sydney suburb of Strathfield. She attended the Methodist Ladies' College, Burwood, and went on to study at the University of Sydney graduating B.Sc. in 1931. Following graduation she was made a botany demonstrator and worked on her Masters, which she received in 1933. She became a member of both the Linnean and Royal societies of New South Wales.

== Career ==
Vickery was offered the position of assistant botanist at the National Herbarium of New South Wales in August 1936, she refused the position on the grounds that she would not be paid the same wage as a man with her qualifications. After negotiations which increased the pay offered, she accepted the position and was the first female researcher appointed to the New South Wales Herbarium. Lilian Ross Fraser and Vickery co-discovered Lomandra hystrix, which they published in Proceedings of the Linnean Society of New South Wales, 62: 286 1937. At the herbarium she began work on plant taxonomy, her major project was the taxonomy of the large grass group Gramineae and she received her D.Sc. in 1959 for her work on the taxonomy of Poa.

In 1960 she came to wider public attention when she was called on the New South Wales Police to identify plant fragments in the kidnap and murder of Graeme Thorne in August 1960. At trial in March 1961 Stephen Leslie Bradley was convicted, based largely on her analysis of crime scene plant matter and soil.

She was M.B.E. in 1962, and retired her position at the herbarium in 1968. She continued to research actively and was involved in several conservation projects, until she died at her home in Cheltenham from cancer in 1979.

The Linnean Society of NSW renamed a grant fund in her honour posthumously in recognition to her annual private contribution to the fund since 1971, a substantial donation to the fund from her estate, and her support for the Society which included council roles since 1969.

Awards
| Preceded by Germaine Joplin | Clarke Medal; 1964 | Succeeded by Mabel Josephine Mackerras |
