= Trapezites atkinsi =

Scientific classification
- Kingdom: Animalia
- Phylum: Arthropoda
- Class: Insecta
- Order: Lepidoptera
- Family: Hesperiidae
- Genus: Trapezites
- Species: T. atkinsi

Binomial name
- Trapezites atkinsi Williams, Williams & Hay, 1998

Species of butterfly

Trapezites atkinsi, the speckled ochre skipper, is a butterfly of the family Hesperiidae. It is found along the south-western coast of Western Australia.

The larvae feed on Acanthocarpus preissii.
