= Lilian Ross Fraser =

Australian botanist

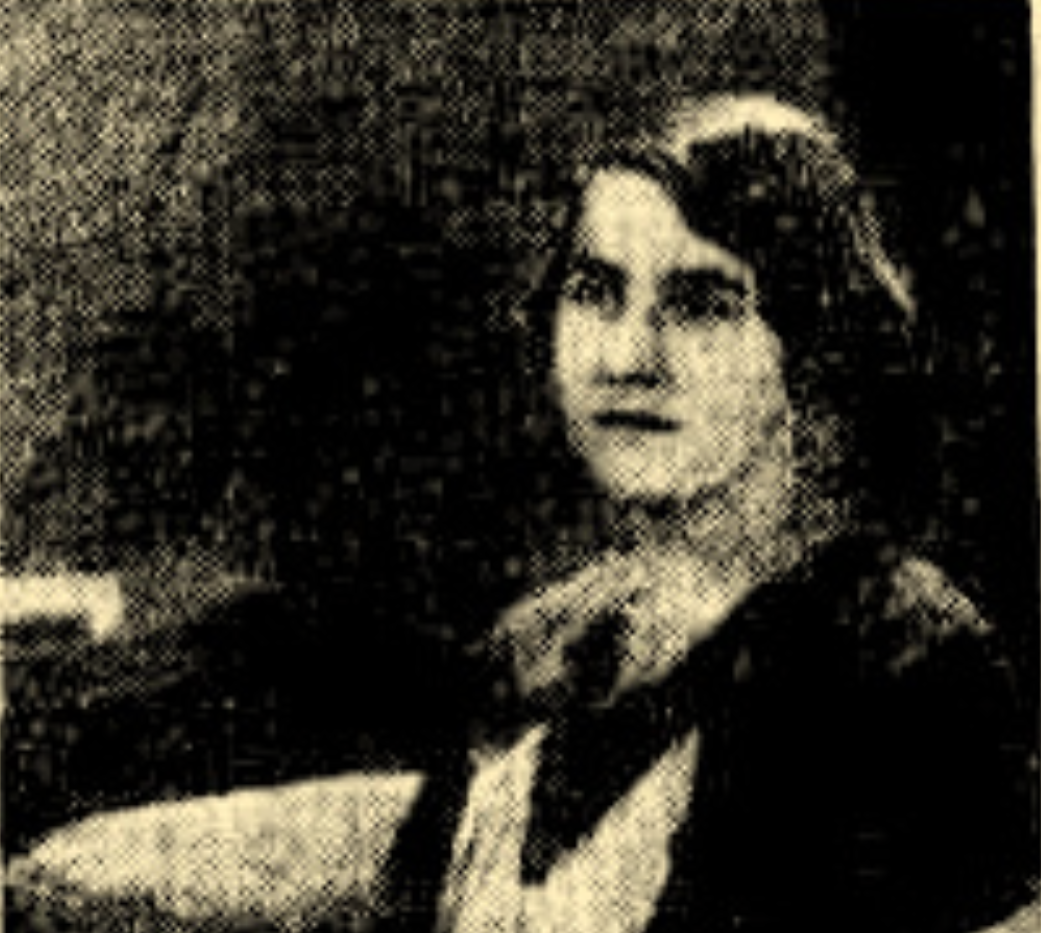
Image of Lilian Ross Fraser from the Sydney Sun newspaper, 20 May 1937

Lilian Ross Fraser (1908– 5 October 1987) was an Australian botanist. She became the first woman inducted as a Fellow of the Australian Institute of Agricultural Science.

== Career ==
Fraser was born in 1908, she was the daughter of Mr and Mrs C. Fraser of Pennant Hills. After graduating from Sydney Girls' High School, she attended the University of Sydney where she earned her Bachelor of Science degree. Fraser then conducted her postgraduate research at her Alma mater which included a study of the taxonomy of sooty moulds. She conducted fieldwork alongside Joyce Winifred Vickery of the Barrington Tops National Park rainforest species in the 1930s before earning her Master's degree. Fraser and Vickery co-discovered Lomandra hystrix, which they published in Proceedings of the Linnean Society of New South Wales, 62: 286 1937. Fraser eventually became the first Australian female to earn a Doctorate of Science in New South Wales by 1937. Upon receiving her doctorate, she also became the first female Australian botanist and left to complete her graduate studies at Imperial College, in London.

Fraser eventually accepted a position with the Australian Department of Agriculture in 1940 as an assistant plant pathologist. Alongside R. J. Swaby, she studied citrus diseases, and co-discovered that Phytophthora citrophthora in citrus trees along Murrumbidgee irrigation areas were the cause of a decline in their growth. As a result of her scientific accomplishments, Fraser became the first woman inducted as a Fellow of the Australian Institute of Agricultural Science and the second female president of the Linnean Society in 1948.

By August 1960, she was promoted to Senior Biologist at the New South Wales Department of Agriculture. Fraser made many collections of smut fungi and her collections of Sphacelotheca mutabilis (now Sporisorium mutabile), Sorosporium polycarpum (now Sporisorium polycarpum), Ustilago serena, Ustilago valentula and Sorosporium fraserianum (now Sporisorium fraserianum) became the type specimens of those species, described by Hans Sydow. Two other new species, Entyloma arctotis Vánky and Sporisorium lingii Vánky, were later found among her collections. By the time Fraser retired in 1973, she has been promoted to Chief Biologist of the Biological and Chemical Research Institute at Rydalmere.

She was awarded the Clarke Medal by the Royal Society of New South Wales in 1976.

The standard author abbreviation L.R.Fraser is used to indicate this person as the author when citing a botanical name.

Awards
Preceded by Joseph Newell Jennings	Clarke Medal; 1976	Succeeded by Alec Trendall
