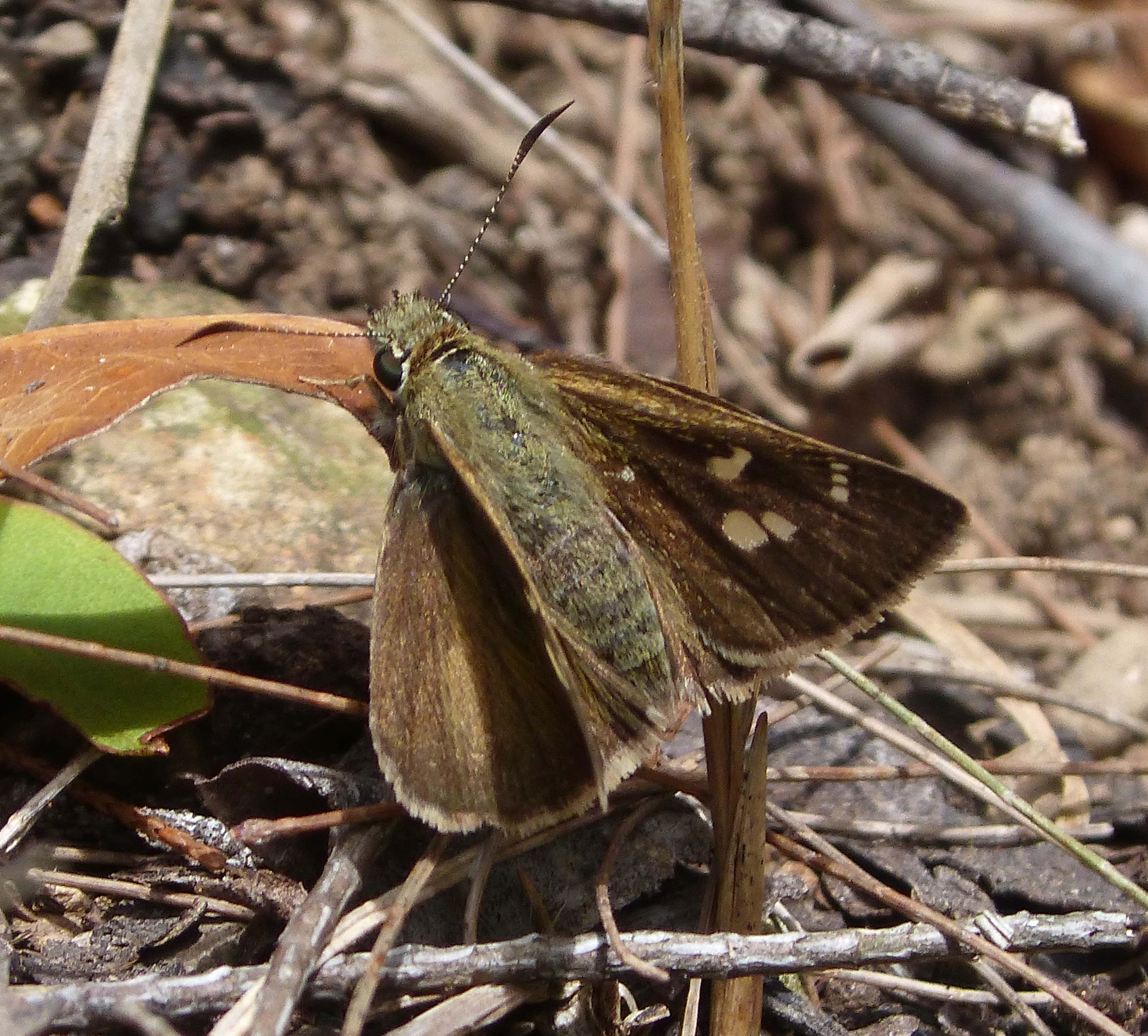
- Trapezites genevieveae

Scientific classification
- Kingdom: Animalia
- Phylum: Arthropoda
- Class: Insecta
- Order: Lepidoptera
- Family: Hesperiidae
- Genus: Trapezites
- Species: T. genevieveae

Binomial name
- Trapezites genevieveae Atkins, 1997

= Trapezites genevieveae =

Species of butterfly

Trapezites genevieveae, the ornate ochre skipper, is a butterfly of the family Hesperiidae. It is found in Australia along the coast of New South Wales and Queensland.

The larvae feed on Lomandra spicata.
