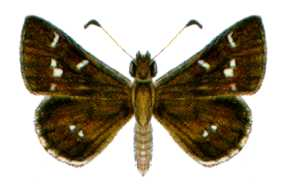

Scientific classification
- Kingdom: Animalia
- Phylum: Arthropoda
- Class: Insecta
- Order: Lepidoptera
- Family: Hesperiidae
- Subfamily: Trapezitinae
- Genus: Pasma; Waterhouse, 1932
- Species: P. tasmanicus

Binomial name
- Pasma tasmanicus Miskin, 1889

Synonyms
- Hesperilla tasmanicus; Hesperilla tasmanicus; Telesto comma

= Pasma tasmanicus =

Species of butterfly

Pasma tasmanicus, the two spotted grass skipper, is the only species in the monotypic butterfly genus Pasma of the family Hesperiidae. The genus was erected by Gustavus Athol Waterhouse in 1932. The species was first described by William Henry Miskin in 1889. It is found in the Australian states of New South Wales, South Australia, Tasmania and Victoria.

The wingspan is about 30 mm.

The larvae feed on various Poa species and Microlaena stipoides.
