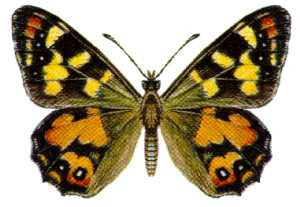
- Argynnina hobartia

Scientific classification
- Kingdom: Animalia
- Phylum: Arthropoda
- Class: Insecta
- Order: Lepidoptera
- Family: Nymphalidae
- Subfamily: Satyrinae
- Tribe: Satyrini
- Subtribe: Hypocystina
- Genus: Argynnina; Butler, 1867

= Argynnina (Satyrinae) =

Genus of butterflies

Argynnina is a genus of satyrid butterflies.

== Species ==
Listed alphabetically:

- Argynnina cyrila Waterhouse & Lyell, 1914
- Argynnina hobartia (Westwood, 1851)
