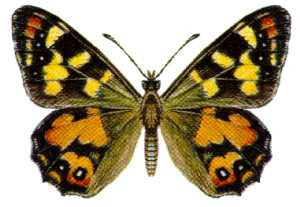

Scientific classification
- Kingdom: Animalia
- Phylum: Arthropoda
- Class: Insecta
- Order: Lepidoptera
- Family: Nymphalidae
- Genus: Argynnina
- Species: A. hobartia

Binomial name
- Argynnina hobartia (Westwood, [1851])

Synonyms
- Lasiommata hobartia Westwood, [1851]; Lasiommata lasus Hewitson, 1864; Argynnina montana Couchman & Couchman, 1977

= Argynnina hobartia =

Species of butterfly

Argynnina hobartia, the Hobart brown, is a butterfly of the family Nymphalidae. It is endemic to Tasmania.

The wingspan is about 30 mm.

The larvae feed on various grasses, including Lolium perenne.

== Subspecies ==
- Argynnina hobartia hobartia (eastern Tasmania and the mountains)
- Argynnina hobartia montana (inland Tasmania in the mountains above 900 meters)
- Argynnina hobartia tasmanica (western Tasmania)
