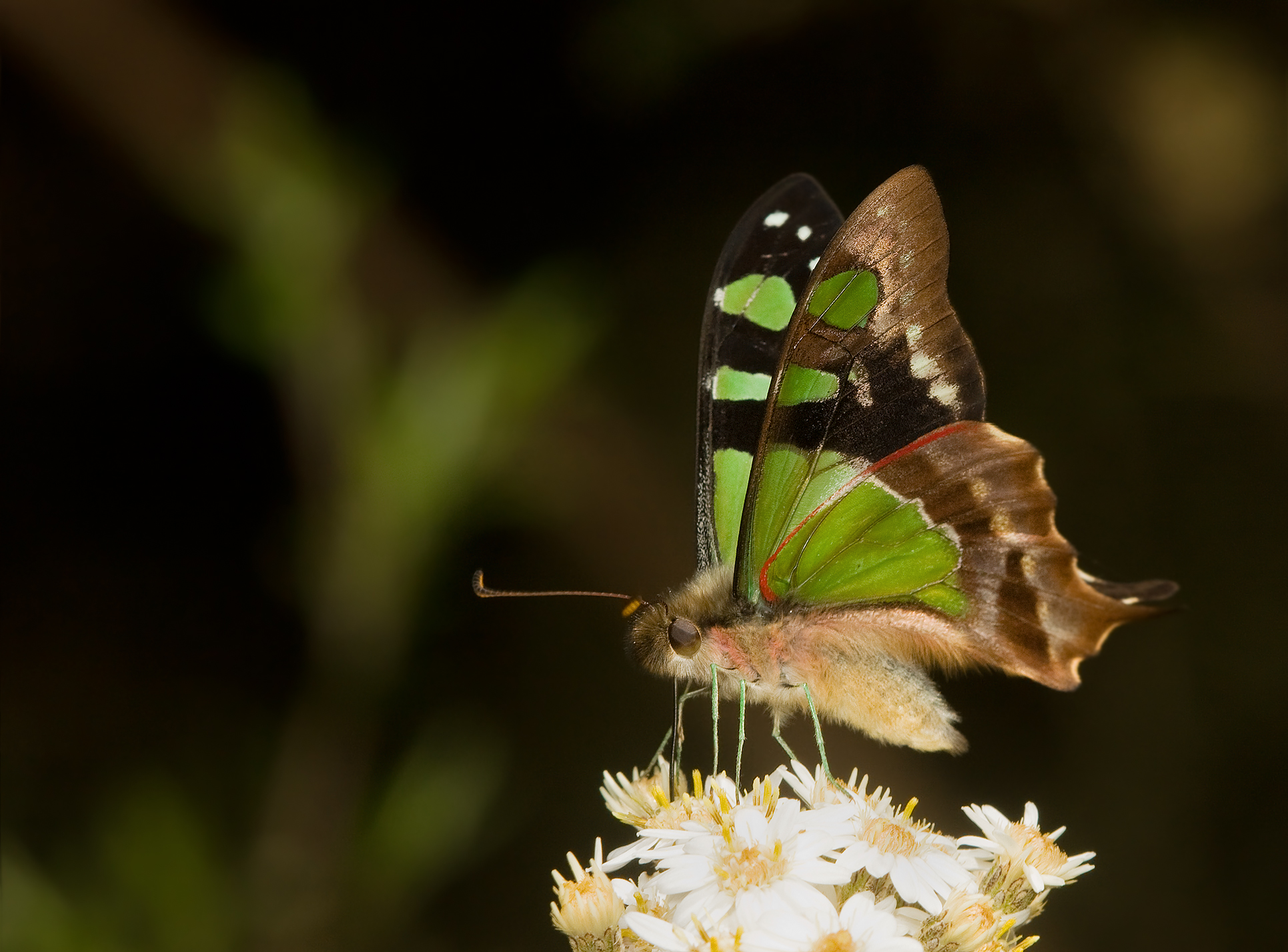
- Macleay's swallowtail (Graphium macleayanus moggana), Franklin-Gordon Wild Rivers National Park, Tasmania, Australia

Scientific classification
- Kingdom: Animalia
- Phylum: Arthropoda
- Clade: Pancrustacea
- Class: Insecta
- Order: Lepidoptera
- Family: Papilionidae
- Genus: Graphium
- Species: G. macleayanus

Binomial name
- Graphium macleayanus (Leach, 1814)
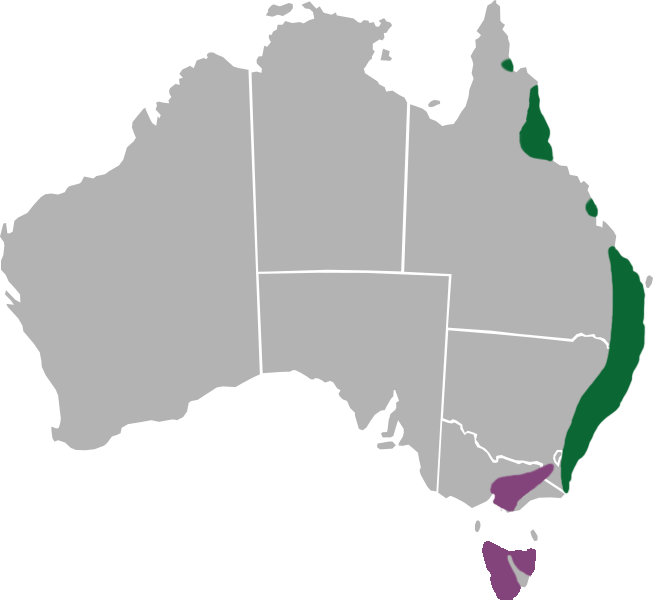
- Range of Macleay's swallowtail G. m. moggana; G. m. macleayanus

= Graphium macleayanus =

Macleay's swallowtail

Species of butterfly endemic to Australia

Graphium macleayanus, the Macleay's swallowtail, is a butterfly belonging to the family Papilionidae. The species was named after Alexander Macleay.

== Taxonomy ==
Macleay's swallowtail was first described by William Elford Leach in 1814. Two subspecies are recorded in Australia, the nominate form, G. m. macleayanus and G. m. moggana, which was first described by Leonard Edgar Couchman in 1965. The name is synonymous with Papilio macleayanus.

== Description ==
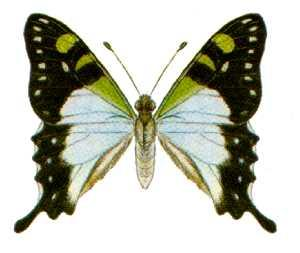
Illustration

The caterpillar grows to a length of 4 cm. The pupa is green with thin yellow lines.

The adult female Macleay's swallowtail has a wingspan of 59 mm, whilst the adult male has a wingspan of 53 mm. The upperside of the wing is green with white markings and black edges. The lower surface is a deeper green with black, brown and white markings. The lower wings are strongly tailed.

== Distribution and habitat ==
The Macleay's swallowtail is one of the most widely distributed swallowtail butterflies in Australia. It is found in eastern Australia including the ACT, New South Wales, Queensland, Victoria and Tasmania. It is the only swallowtail found in Tasmania. The species has also been found on Lord Howe Island and Norfolk Island, but not since 1893. The habitat of the species includes urban areas, forests, woodlands and heath.

== Behaviour ==
The caterpillars are green, with small white dots all over the body and a humped thorax. They feed on the foliage of members in the Atherosperma, Cinnamomum, Cryptocarya, Daphnandra, Doryphora, Endiandra and Tasmannia genera.

The adults feed on nectar from flowers, including the genera Leptospermum, Lantana and Buddleia. The flight period is from August to March.

== See also ==
- Papilionidae
- List of butterflies of Australia
- List of butterflies of Victoria
- List of butterflies of Tasmania
