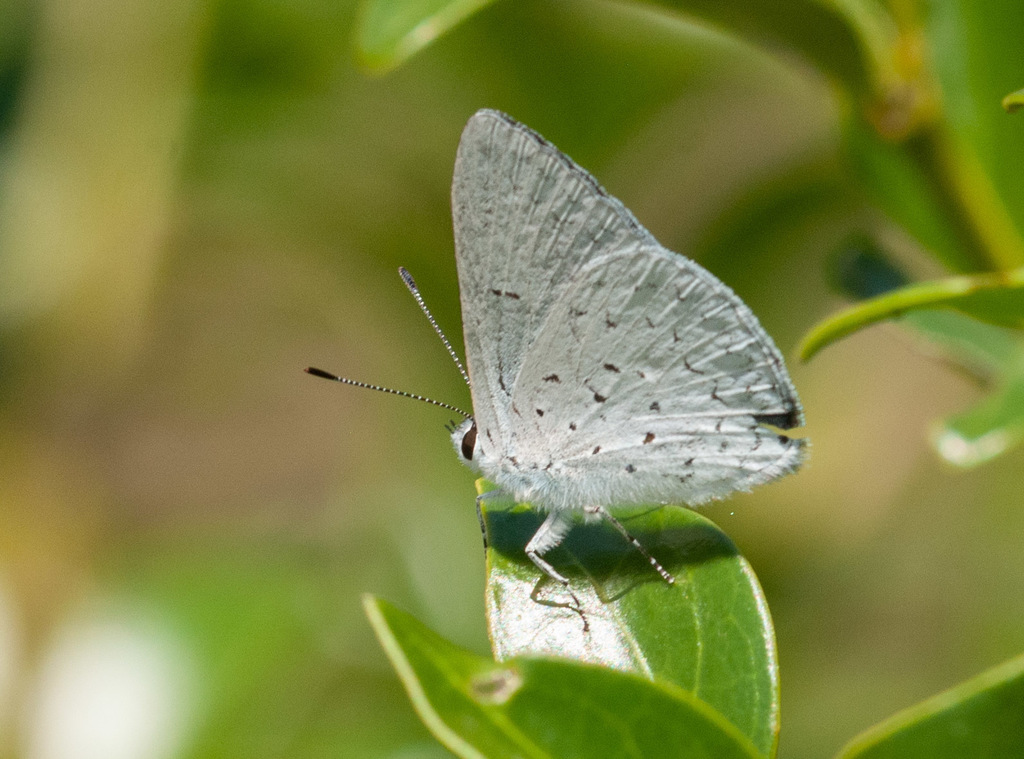

Scientific classification
- Kingdom: Animalia
- Phylum: Arthropoda
- Class: Insecta
- Order: Lepidoptera
- Family: Lycaenidae
- Genus: Candalides
- Species: C. consimilis

Binomial name
- Candalides consimilis Waterhouse, 1942

Synonyms
- Holochila consimilis toza Kerr, 1967; Candalides goodingi Tindale, 1965

= Candalides consimilis =

Consimilis blue

Species of butterfly

Candalides consimilis, the consimilis blue, is a species of butterfly of the family Lycaenidae. It was described by Gustavus Athol Waterhouse in 1942. It is found in Australia.

The wingspan is about 30 mm.

The larvae feed on the flowers of Hedera helix, Polyscias elegans, Polyscias sambucifolia, Ceratopetalum gummiferum and Alectryon coriaceus. They are variable in colour, ranging from pink, orange or yellow to green.

== Subspecies ==
- Candalides consimilis consimilis (Australia: Townsville to eastern Victoria)
- Candalides consimilis goodingi Tindale, 1965 (Australia: eastern Victoria)
- Candalides consimilis toza (Kerr, 1967) (Australia: Cape York, Claudie River)
