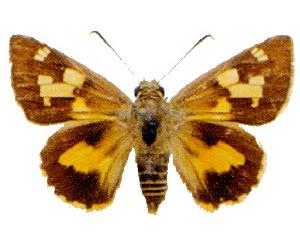

Scientific classification
- Kingdom: Animalia
- Phylum: Arthropoda
- Class: Insecta
- Order: Lepidoptera
- Family: Hesperiidae
- Genus: Trapezites
- Species: T. taori

Binomial name
- Trapezites taori Atkins, 1997

= Trapezites taori =

Species of butterfly

Trapezites taori, the Taori skipper or sandstone ochre, is a butterfly of the family Hesperiidae. It is found in a small area of the Blackdown Tableland in Queensland, Australia.

The wingspan is about 25 mm.

The larvae feed on Lomandra confertifolia pallida.
