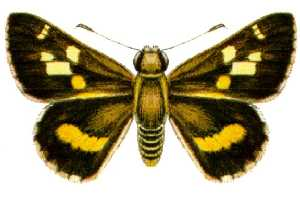

Scientific classification
- Kingdom: Animalia
- Phylum: Arthropoda
- Class: Insecta
- Order: Lepidoptera
- Family: Hesperiidae
- Genus: Trapezites
- Species: T. maheta

Binomial name
- Trapezites maheta Hewitson, 1877

Synonyms
- Hesperia maheta

= Trapezites maheta =

Species of butterfly

Trapezites maheta, the Maheta skipper or northern silver ochre, is a butterfly of the family Hesperiidae. It is found in Australia in Queensland and northern New South Wales.

The wingspan is about 30 mm.

The larvae feed on Lomandra hystrix and Lomandra multiflora.
