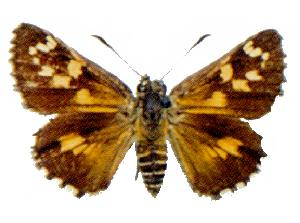

Scientific classification
- Kingdom: Animalia
- Phylum: Arthropoda
- Class: Insecta
- Order: Lepidoptera
- Family: Hesperiidae
- Genus: Trapezites
- Species: T. waterhousei

Binomial name
- Trapezites waterhousei Mayo & Atkins, 1992

= Trapezites waterhousei =

Species of butterfly

Trapezites waterhousei is a butterfly of the family Hesperiidae. It is found in Western Australia.

The wingspan is about 25 mm.

The larvae feed on Xerolirion divaricata.
