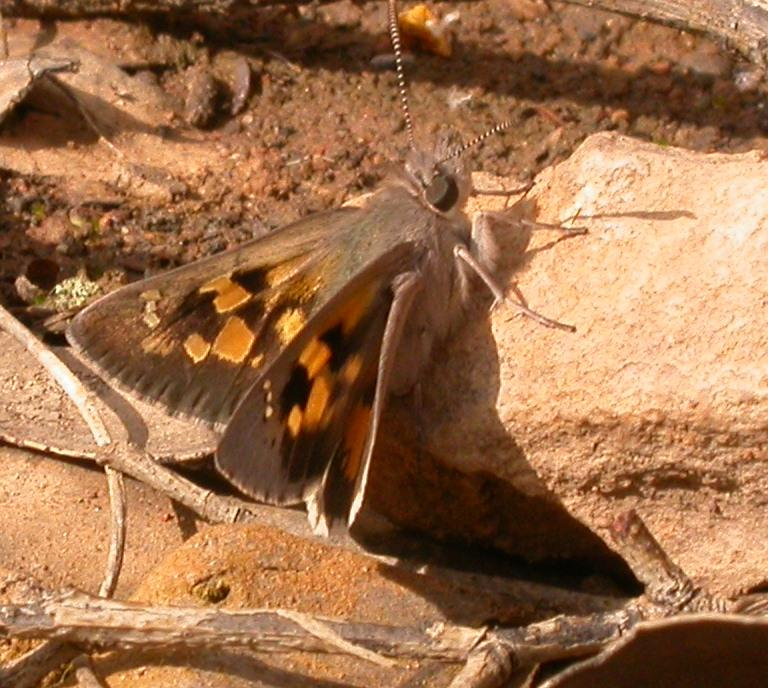
- Trapezites phigalia

Scientific classification
- Kingdom: Animalia
- Phylum: Arthropoda
- Class: Insecta
- Order: Lepidoptera
- Family: Hesperiidae
- Subfamily: Trapezitinae
- Genus: Trapezites; Hübner, 1819

Species
- See text

= Trapezites (butterfly) =

Genus of butterflies

Trapezites is a genus of skipper butterflies in the family Hesperiidae. All species are endemic to Australia.

== Species ==
The genus includes the following species:

- Trapezites argenteoornatus Hewitson, 1868
- Trapezites atkinsi Williams, Williams & Hay, 1998
- Trapezites eliena Hewitson, 1868
- Trapezites genevieveae Atkins, 1997
- Trapezites heteromacula Meyrick & Lower, 1902
- Trapezites iacchus Fabricius, 1775
- Trapezites iacchoides Waterhouse, 1903
- Trapezites lutea Tepper, 1882
- Trapezites macqueeni Kerr & Sands, 1970
- Trapezites maheta Hewitson, 1877
- Trapezites petalia Hewitson, 1868
- Trapezites phigalia Hewitson, 1868
- Trapezites phigalioides Waterhouse, 1903
- Trapezites praxedes Plötz, 1884
- Trapezites sciron Waterhouse & Lyell, 1914
- Trapezites symmomus Hübner, 1823
- Trapezites taori Atkins, 1997
- Trapezites waterhousei Mayo & Atkins, 1992
