= George Lyell =

Australian entomologist

- Born: July 25, 1866
- Died: 19 May 1951 (aged 85)
- Education: Stawell State School
- Occupation: Naturalist
- Parents: George Lyell, Sr. (father); Jane Avery (mother)

George Lyell (1866–1951) was an Australian naturalist. He was born on 25 July at Ararat, Victoria. His father, George senior, was a printer born in Scotland; his mother, Jane (née Avery), was born in England. Lyell was educated at Stawell State School. In his late teens, his family moved to South Melbourne, and Lyell worked for seven years, progressing from a position as a junior clerk to becoming the head of a dairy machinery department. In 1890 Lyell accepted a partnership with a different dairy appliance manufacturer, which was also the sole supplier of entomological equipment in Victoria.

In 1914, together with Gustavus Athol Waterhouse, Lyell published The Butterflies of Australia, a comprehensive description of hundreds of species, including many that had never been described in prior publications. At the age of 84 he gave up field collecting and he died at Gisborne on 19 May 1951.

== See also ==
- List of Australian butterflies
