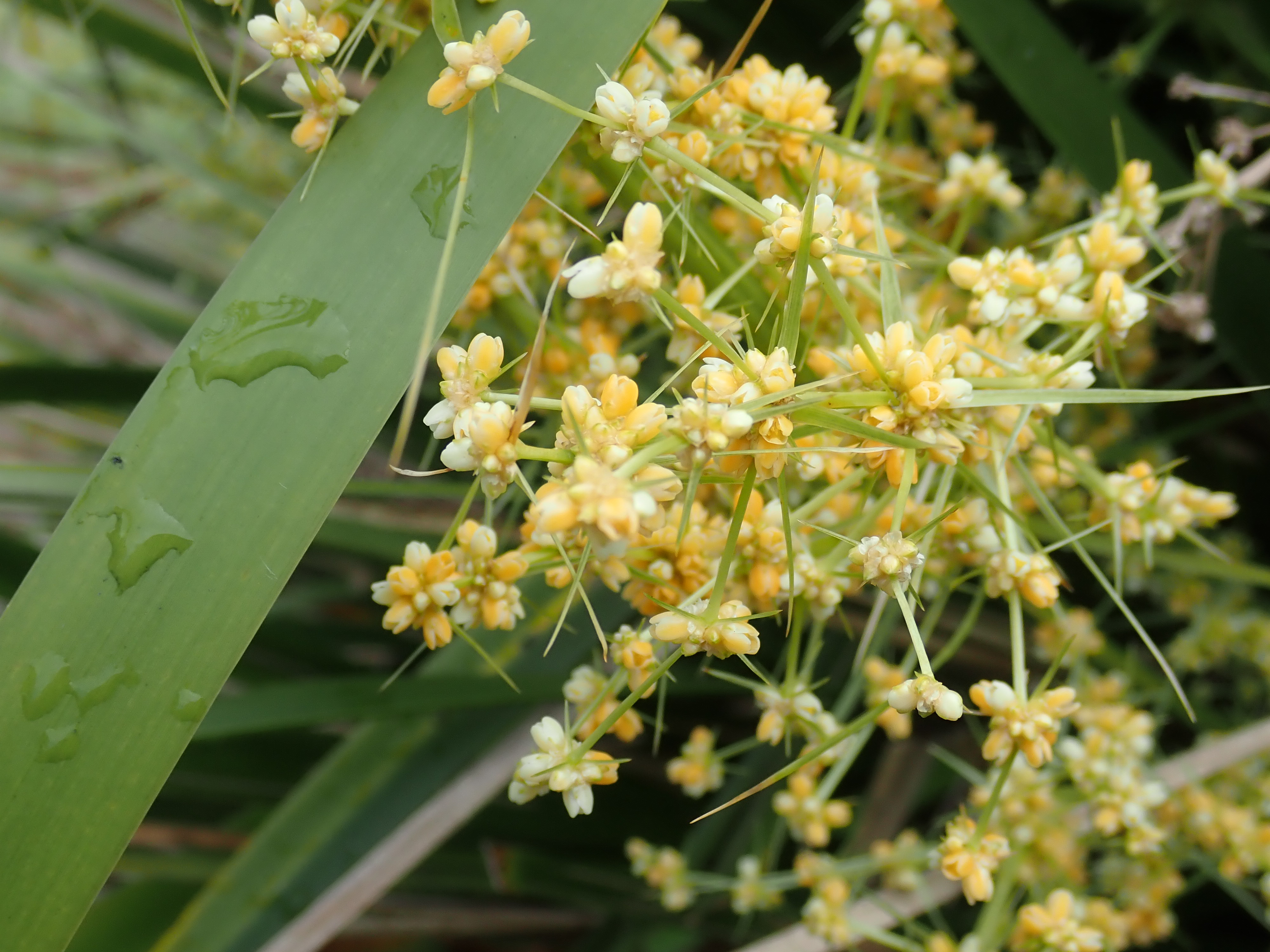

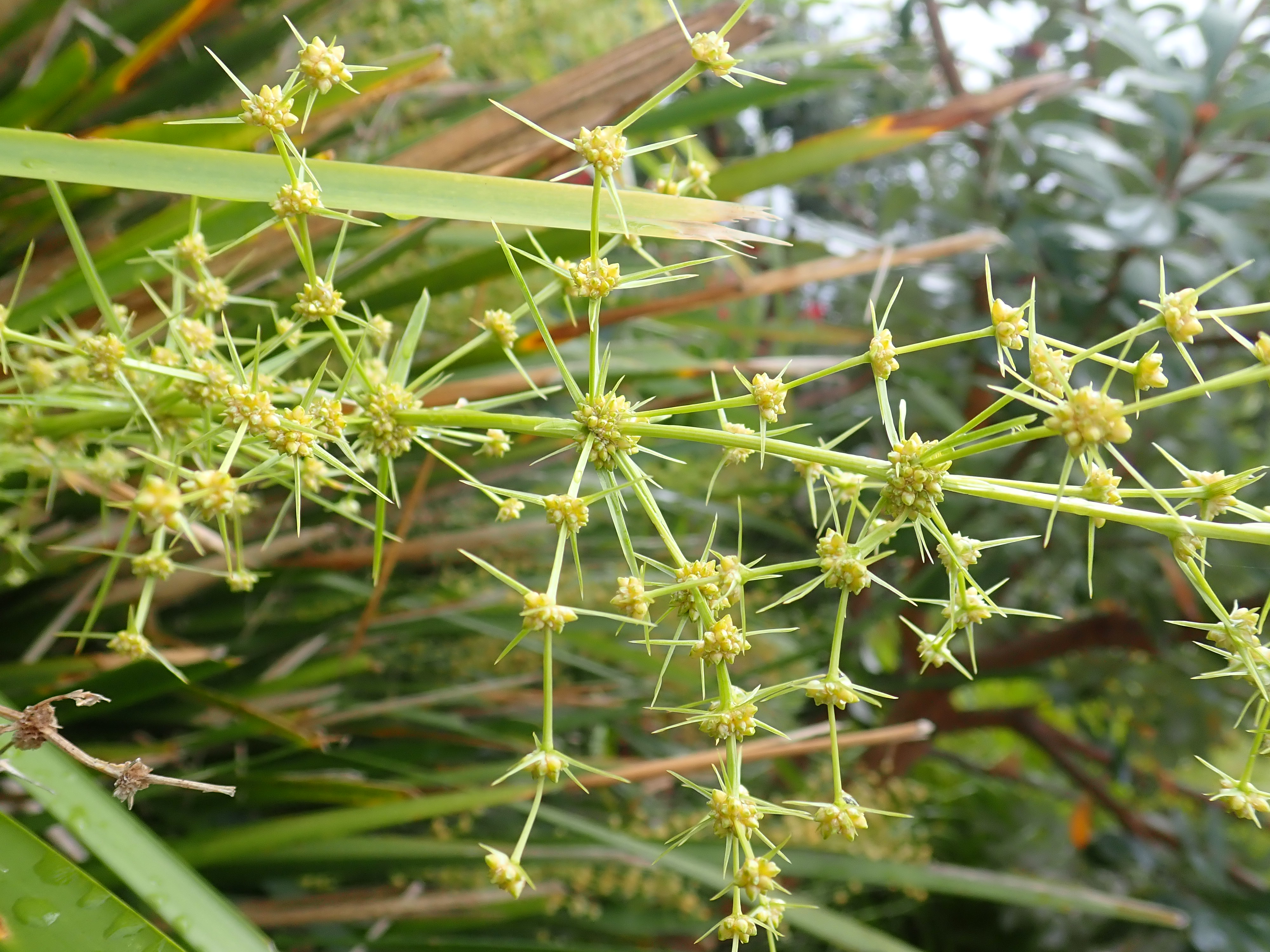

Scientific classification
- Kingdom: Plantae
- Clade: Tracheophytes
- Clade: Angiosperms
- Clade: Monocots
- Order: Asparagales
- Family: Asparagaceae
- Subfamily: Lomandroideae
- Genus: Lomandra
- Species: L. hystrix

Binomial name
- Lomandra hystrix (R.Br.) L.R.Fraser & Vickery

Synonyms
- Xerotes hystrix R.Br.

= Lomandra hystrix =

Species of flowering plant

Lomandra hystrix, commonly known as green mat-rush, or creek mat-rush, is a perennial, rhizomatous a tall herb of Northern NSW to North Queensland wet tropics, Australia.

== Taxonomy ==
This species was first described in 1810 by Robert Brown as Xerotes hystrix. In 1937 Lilian Ross Fraser and Joyce Winifred Vickery gave it its current name of Lomandra hystrix.

== Description ==
The leaves are 80 cm to 100 cm long, and about 10 mm to 20 mm wide. It grows beside watercourses in upland and mountain rainforest.

The plant is often used for revegetation and erosion control. The starchy, fleshy bases of the leaves are edible, tasting of raw peas. Even when the roots are exposed it will cling tenaciously in poor soils.

This species is closely related to L. longifolia; the inner bract and flowers are similar, but it differs in leaf apex, lack of conspicuous marginal sclerenchyma bands on leaves, and in inflorescence branching.
