= Hilltopping (biology) =

Animal behaviour

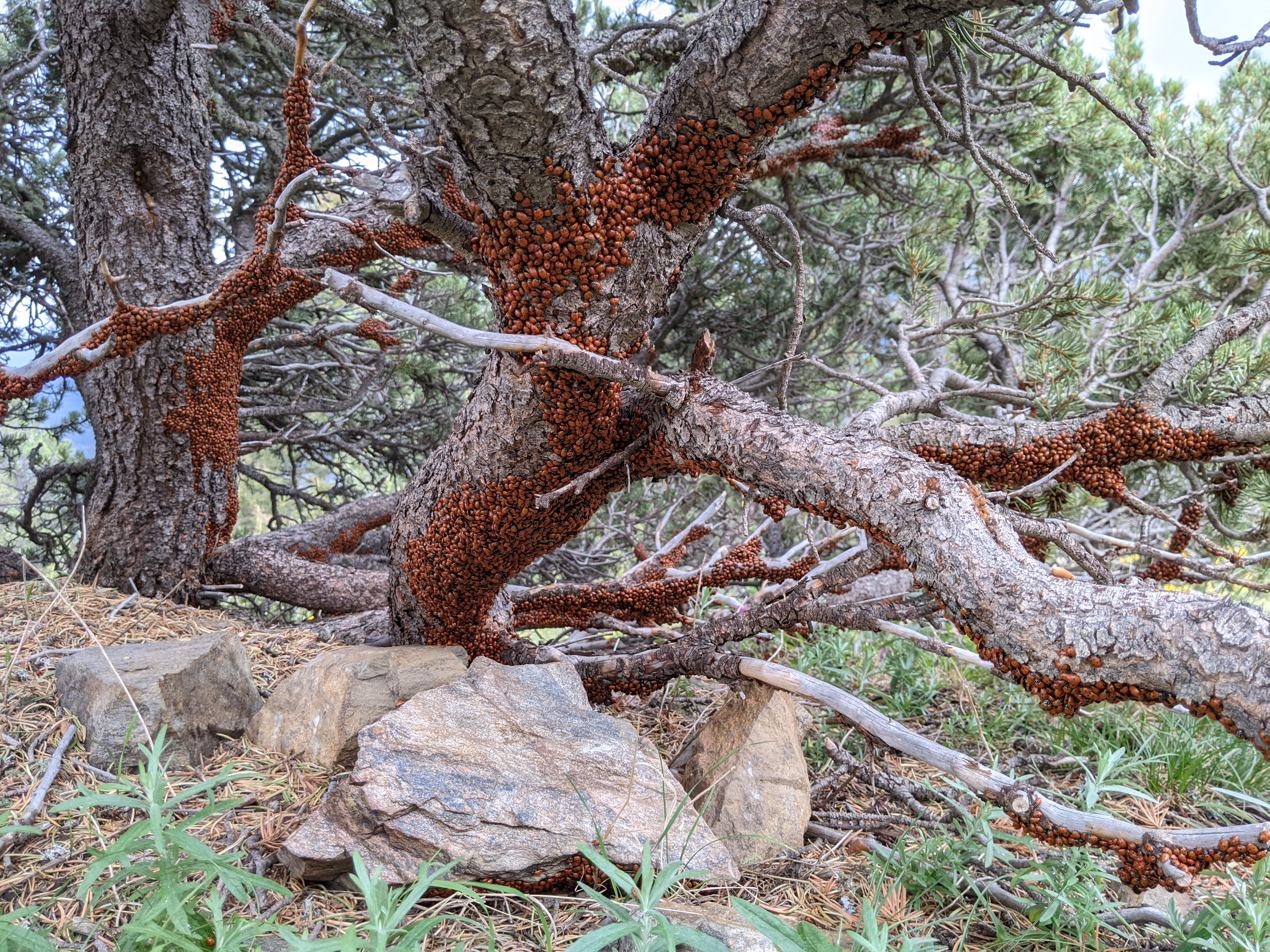
A mass gathering of lady bugs near the peak of Glorieta Baldy in Northern New Mexico

Hilltopping (also spelt hill-topping) is a mate-location behaviour seen in many insects including butterflies, dragonflies, bumblebees, wasps, beetles and flies.

Males of many butterfly species may be found flying up to and staying on a hilltop - for days on end if necessary. Females, desirous of mating, fly up the hill. Males dash around the top, competing for the best part of the area - usually the very top; as the male with the best territory at the top of the hill would have the best chance of mating with the occasional female, who knows the "top male" must be strong and thus genetically fit. Many authors consider this a form of lekking behaviour. Many butterfly species including swallowtails, nymphalids, metal-marks and lycaenids are known to hill-top.

In some Acraea butterflies, widespread infection by Wolbachia results in a rarity of males and in these species the females widely engage in hilltopping behaviour. Female butterflies at hilltopping sites are predominantly unmated individuals.

Studies have shown that even slight elevation differences on flat terrain can trigger hilltopping behaviour. Flowering or tall trees may induce hilltopping behaviour.

The concentrating effect of hilltopping on butterfly populations makes such locations of special conservation significance.
