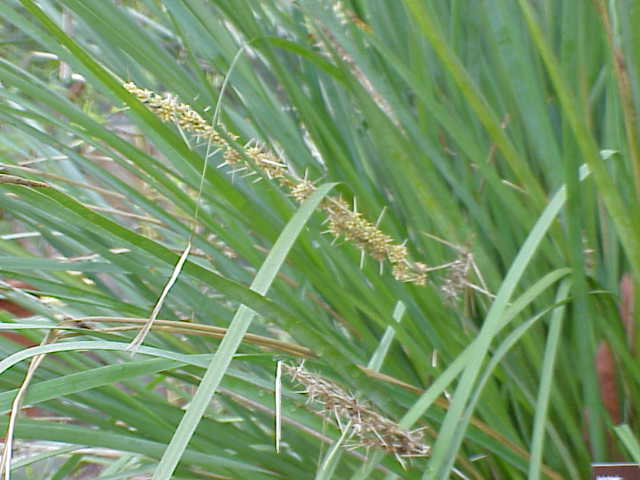

Scientific classification
- Kingdom: Plantae
- Clade: Tracheophytes
- Clade: Angiosperms
- Clade: Monocots
- Order: Asparagales
- Family: Asparagaceae
- Subfamily: Lomandroideae
- Genus: Lomandra
- Species: L. filiformis

Binomial name
- Lomandra filiformis (Thunb.) Britten

Subspecies
- L. f. filiformis; L. f. conacea; L. f. flavior

Synonyms
- Dracaena filiformis Thunb.; Xerotes denticulata R.Br.; Xerotes filiformis (Thunb.) R.Br.; Xerotes tenuifolia R.Br.; Xerotes thunbergii F.Muell. nom. illeg.

= Lomandra filiformis =

Species of flowering plant

Lomandra filiformis, commonly known as wattle mat-rush, is a tussock forming perennial herb that is native to Australia. It is sparsely tufted, with strap-like leaves and yellow flowers. It grows in dry sclerophyll forest and grassy woodland, usually on well-drained rocky or sandy soils.

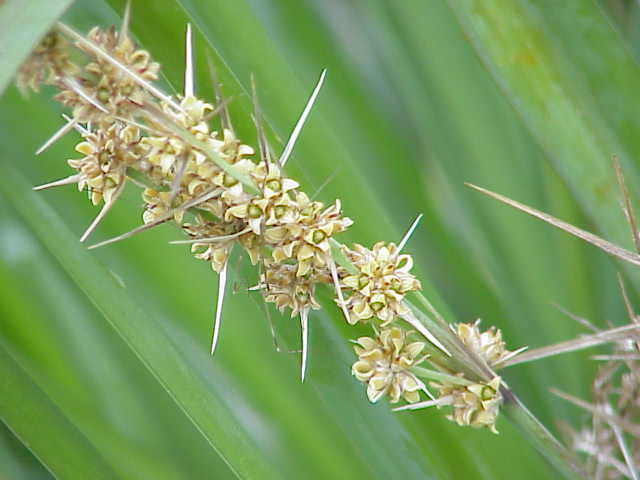
Flowers
