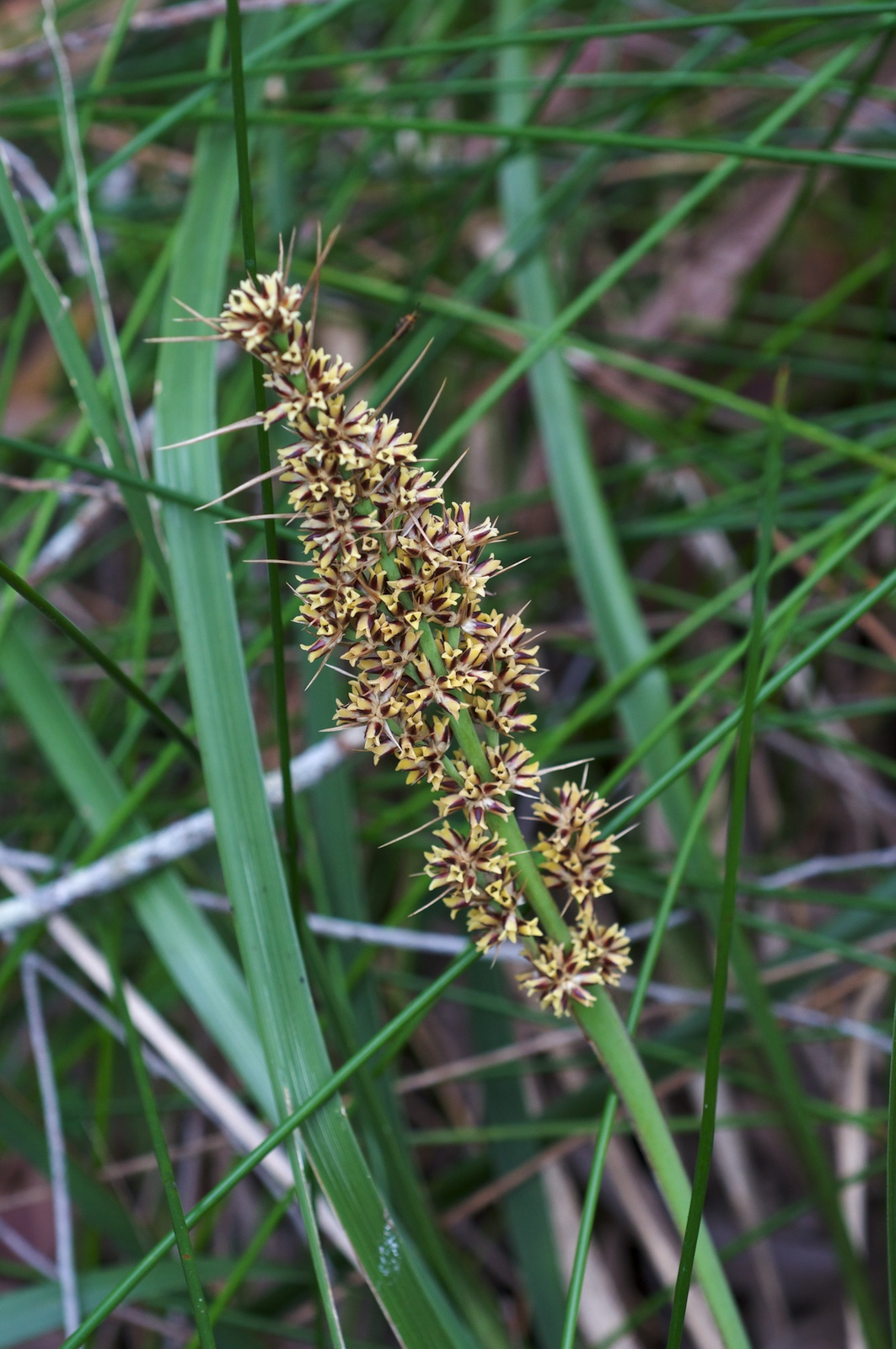

Scientific classification
- Kingdom: Plantae
- Clade: Tracheophytes
- Clade: Angiosperms
- Clade: Monocots
- Order: Asparagales
- Family: Asparagaceae
- Subfamily: Lomandroideae
- Genus: Lomandra
- Species: L. longifolia

Binomial name
- Lomandra longifolia Labill.

Synonyms
- Xerotes longifolia (Labill.) R.Br.

= Lomandra longifolia =

Species of flowering plant

Lomandra longifolia, commonly known as spiny-head mat-rush, spiky-headed mat-rush, or basket grass, is a perennial, rhizomatous herb found throughout eastern Australia. The leaves are 40 cm to 80 cm long, and generally have a leaf of about 8 mm to 12 mm wide. It grows in a variety of soil types and is frost, heat and drought tolerant. Labillardiere described Lomandra longifolia from a specimen collected in Tasmania.

== Distribution ==
L. longifolia is native to the east of Australia, common to all states and territories except Northern Territory and Western Australia.

== Cultivation ==
This strappy leaf plant is often used in landscaping in Australia, New Zealand, Spain, and the United States, due to its high level of drought tolerance. The breeding of more compact finer leaf forms has made Lomandra longifolia popular as an evergreen grass-like plant in home plantings. Tanika, Lomandra longifolia 'LM300', also known as breeze grass in the US, was the first fine leaf type. It still has the finest leaf of any Lomandra longifolia, with a width of 3 mm. In temperatures down to −7 degrees Celsius these plants stay evergreen, and this variety has been recorded to live in the USA at a number of sites including Alabama, at −10 degrees Celsius.

L. longifolia is closely related to L. hystrix, the main differences being that the leaf of L. hystrix has teeth on each side of the longer main end point, whereas that of L. longifolia has side teeth equal if not longer than the central one (a W shape).

== Uses ==
Many parts of the plant are edible. The seeds on their own are tough, however may be ground and turned into flour, with which Indigenous Australians may use to make damper. The long, flat, fibrous leaves are used for weaving dilly bags, fishing nets, mats, baskets, and other goods. The flowers are edible and taste of peas. The base of the leaves contains water, and was chewed by those in danger of dehydration. They taste of peas or celery.

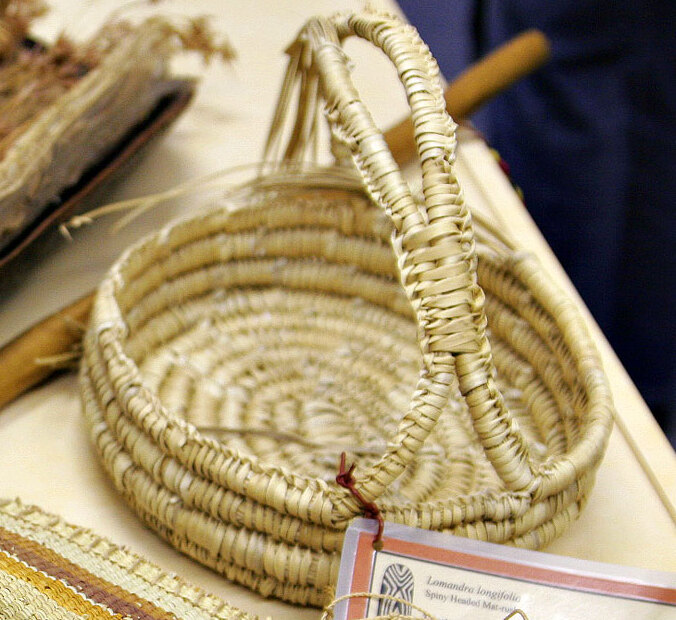
Aboriginal-style basket made from lomandra longifolia.
