= Gustavus Athol Waterhouse =

Australian entomologist (1877–1950)

Gustavus Athol Waterhouse (21 May 1877 – 29 July 1950), was an eminent Australian entomologist.

Waterhouse was born at Waverley in Sydney. His father, Gustavus John, was a Tasmanian born ship owner who also served as an alderman on the Sydney Municipal Council. His mother, Mary Jane, was also Australian born. Both parents were avid collectors: Gustavus senior collected Pacific Island artefacts; and Mary Jane collected shells. They had five children, Athol being the eldest. He was educated at Waverley Public, then at the Sydney Grammar School, where he was followed by his brothers—Eben Gowrie and Leslie Vickery—and spent lunch hours browsing in the Australian Museum next door.

After matriculating from Grammar in 1895, Waterhouse enrolled at the University of Sydney, where he graduated with bachelor's degrees in science (1899) and engineering (1900). His science degree was awarded with first class honours in geology and palaeontology, having studied volcanic dykes in the Triassic rocks around Sydney under Professor (Sir) Edgeworth David.

Upon graduation, Waterhouse was employed as an assistant assayer at the Sydney branch of the Royal Mint until 1926.Towards the end of his time at the Royal Mint he was awarded his Doctor of Science degree in 1924.

He married Beatrice Talbot Stretton at Waverley on 12 September 1902 in a Methodist ceremony. The marriage produced two daughters and three sons. Their son, Stretton Gustavus John Waterhouse, was killed in action in New Guinea in 1943 during WW II. The Stretton Waterhouse Memorial Prize, donated by Mrs Waterhouse in his memory, is awarded annually to the Dux of Year Ten at Newington College.
