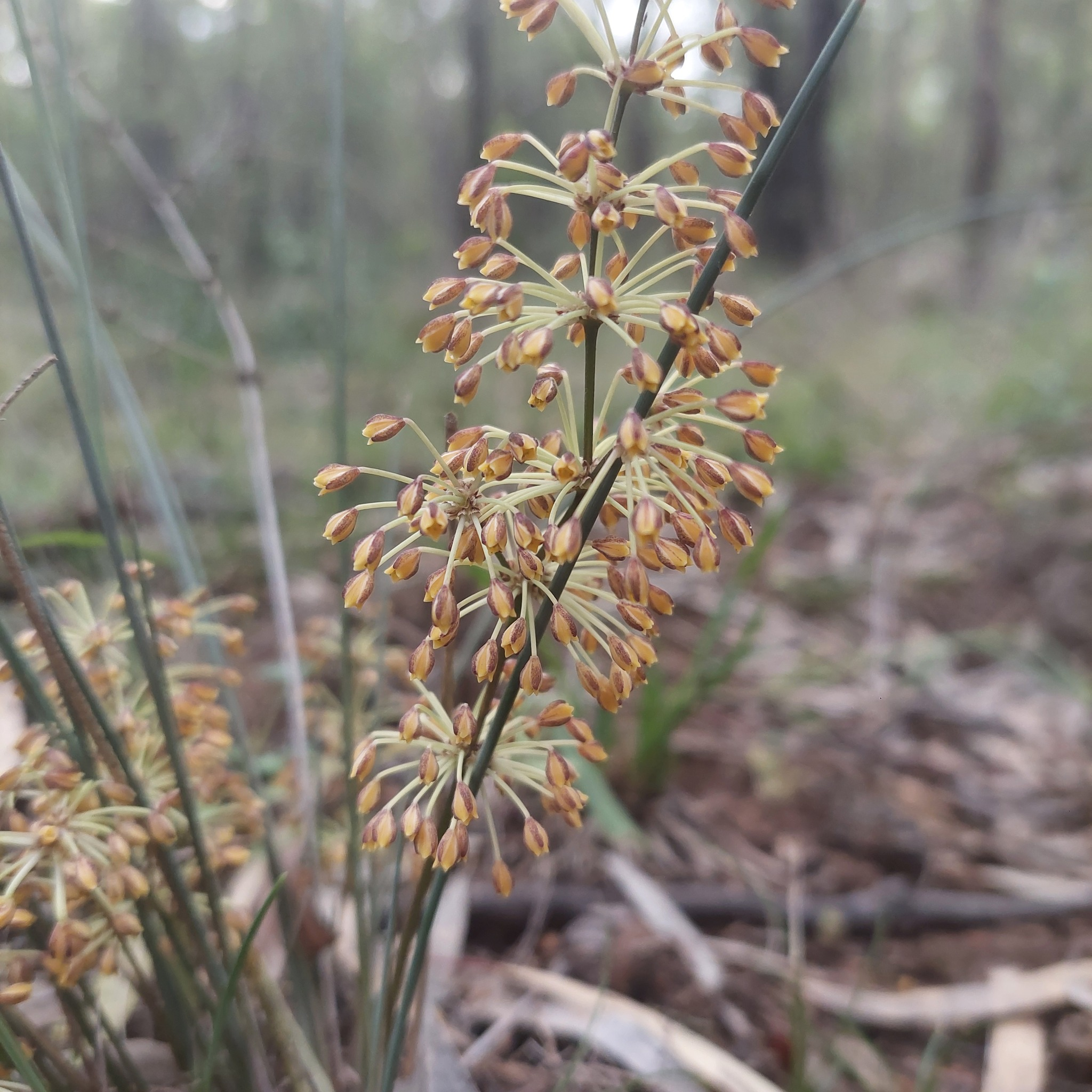
- Male inflorescence (Deriah Aboriginal Area, NSW)

Scientific classification
- Kingdom: Plantae
- Clade: Tracheophytes
- Clade: Angiosperms
- Clade: Monocots
- Order: Asparagales
- Family: Asparagaceae
- Subfamily: Lomandroideae
- Genus: Lomandra
- Species: L. briggsiana

Binomial name
- Lomandra briggsiana R.L.Barrett & T.C.Wilson

= Lomandra briggsiana =

Species of plant in the asparagus family

Lomandra briggsiana is a species of plant in the Asparagaceae family, first described in 2023 by the Australian botanists Russell Barrett and Trevor Wilson. The species epithet, briggsiana, honours botanist Barbara Briggs.

== Description ==
It is a perennial plant, endemic to New South Wales.

The greyish green, finely ribbed leaves are terete, and 15–45 cm long, and generally 1–1.5 mm wide. The male inflorescence has either one or two branches and the flower clusters are whorled, with the flowers on 1-4mm long pedicels. The female inflorescence is similar but unbranched and having sessile flowers.

This species is similar to Lomandra beaniana but the male inflorescence of L. beaniana has long branchlets. It differs from Lomandra multiflora by its terete, glaucous leaves and its erect rhizomes, and it differs from Lomandra decomposita by its terete leaves, and from L. ramosissima by its terete leaves and white to cream leaf sheaths.

== Distribution ==
It has been found from the Capertee Valley to Tamworth and the Barrington Tops, growing generally in woodlands.

== Images ==
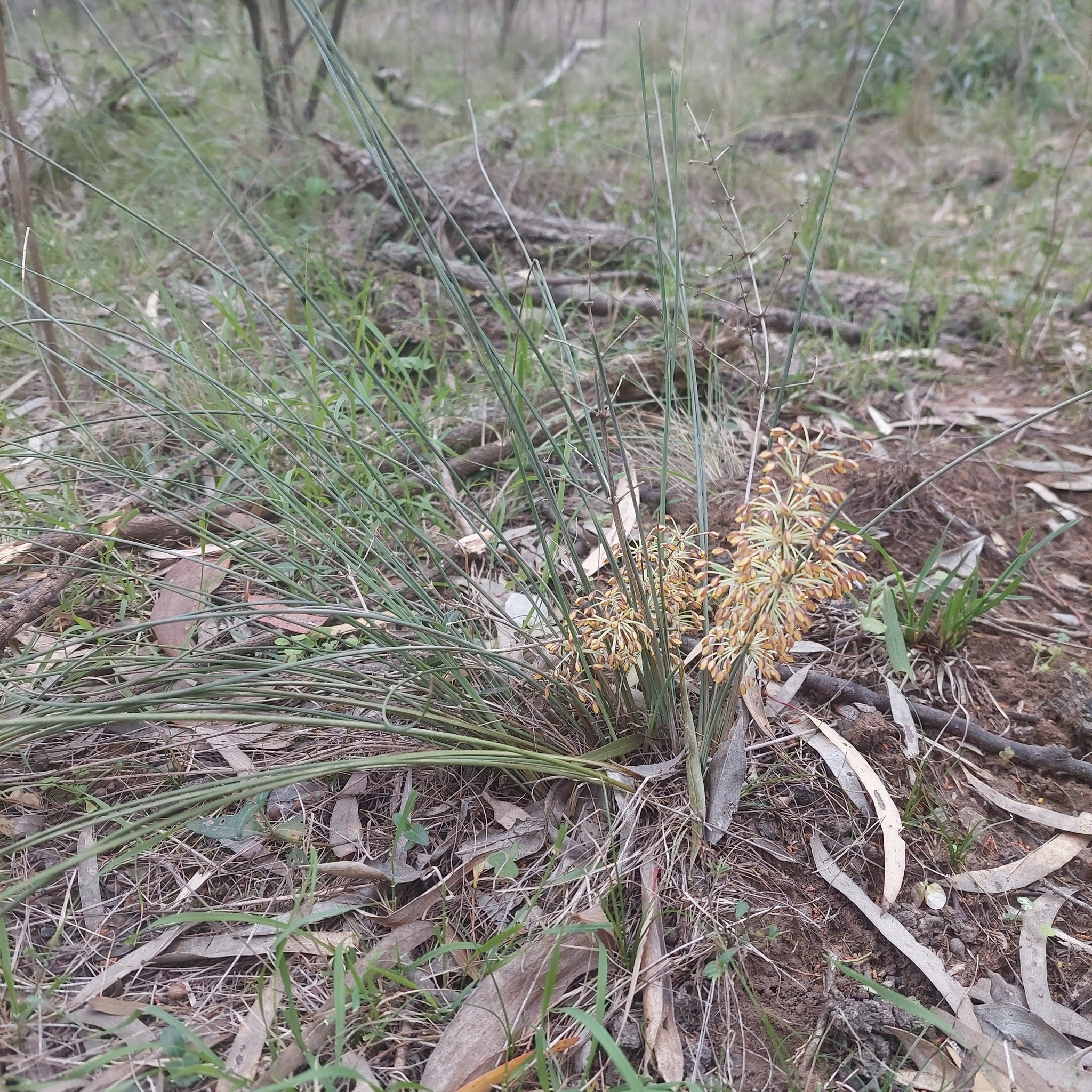
plant (showing the terete leaves)

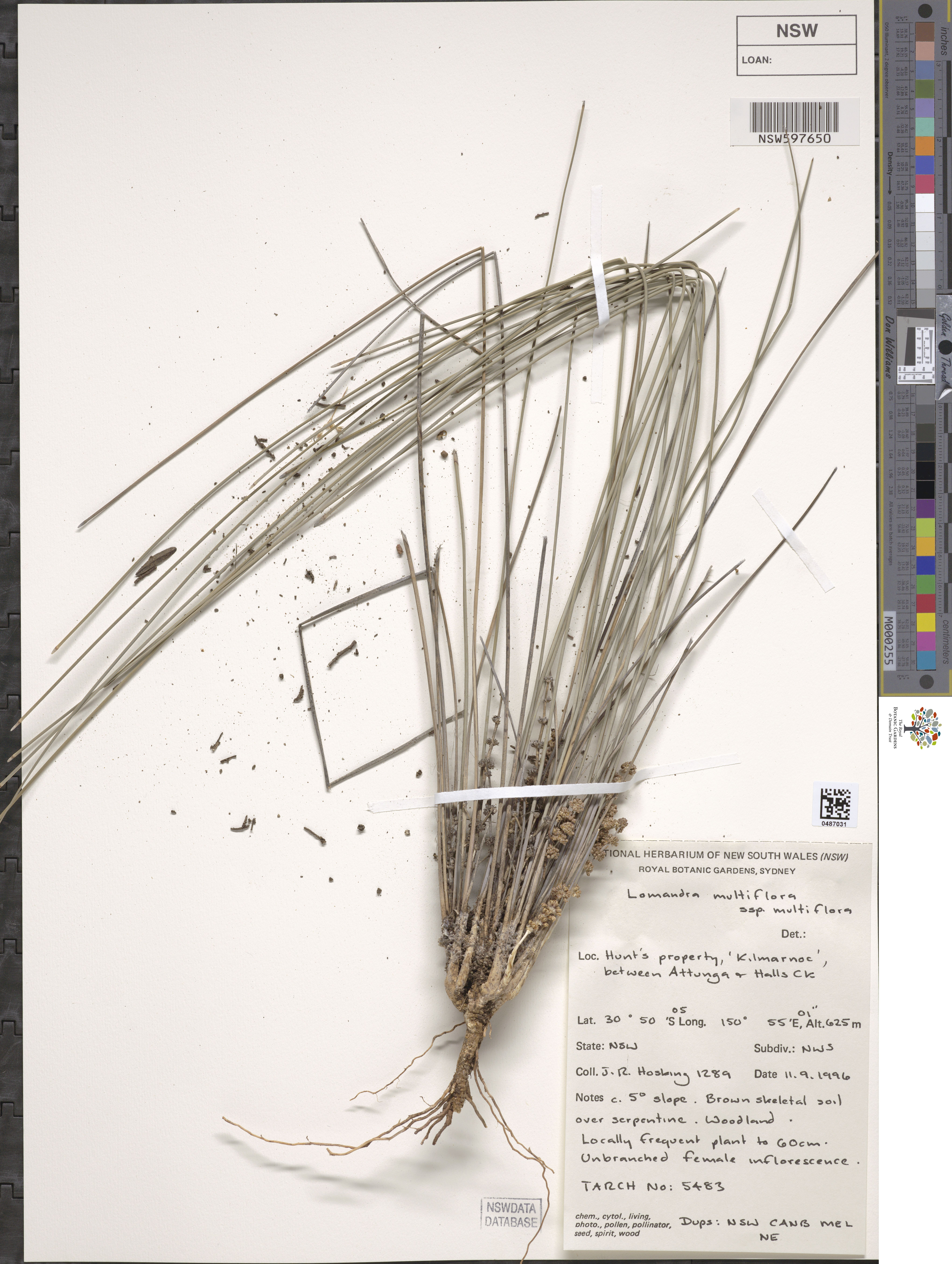
NSW597650 showing female inflorescences
