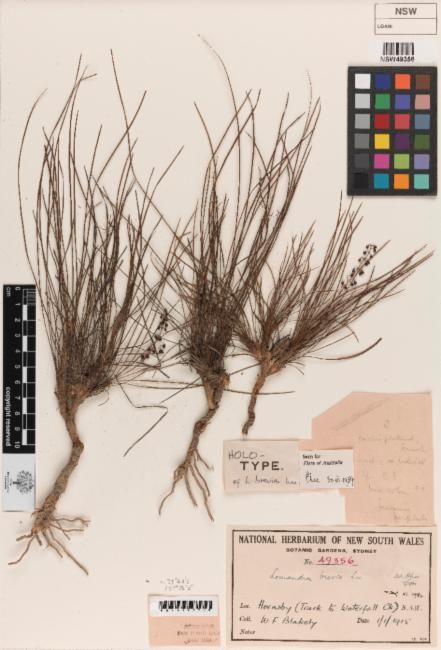
- Holotype (NSW49356)

Scientific classification
- Kingdom: Plantae
- Clade: Tracheophytes
- Clade: Angiosperms
- Clade: Monocots
- Order: Asparagales
- Family: Asparagaceae
- Subfamily: Lomandroideae
- Genus: Lomandra
- Species: L. brevis

Binomial name
- Lomandra brevis A.T.Lee

= Lomandra brevis =

Species of plant

Lomandra brevis is a species of plant in the Asparagaceae family, first described in 1962 by Alma Theodora Lee.

It is a perennial and is endemic to New South Wales, occurring in the Sydney region in dry sclerophyll forest on sandstone derived soils.

It grows in small dense tussocks. It flowers in both spring and autumn. The male inflorescence is from 10 to 15 cm and is unbranched or has a few short branches, while the female inflorescence is about 5 cm long and is unbranched.
