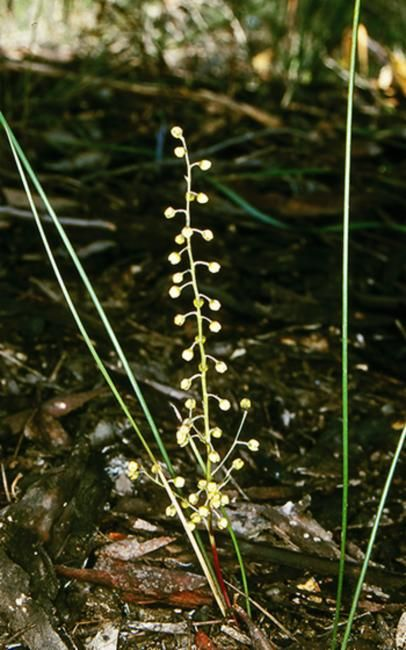

Scientific classification
- Kingdom: Plantae
- Clade: Tracheophytes
- Clade: Angiosperms
- Clade: Monocots
- Order: Asparagales
- Family: Asparagaceae
- Subfamily: Lomandroideae
- Genus: Lomandra
- Species: L. cylindrica

Binomial name
- Lomandra cylindrica A.T.Lee

= Lomandra cylindrica =

Species of plant

Lomandra cylindrica is a species of plant in the Asparagaceae family, first described in 1962 by Alma Theodora Lee.

It is a perennial and is endemic to Australia, being found in New South Wales and Victoria, where it occurs in dry sclerophyll forest on sandy soils.

It is sparsely tufted. The male inflorescence is from 1/3 to 1/2 the length of the leaves and is unbranched or has a few short branches, while the female inflorescence is shorter and rarely branched.
