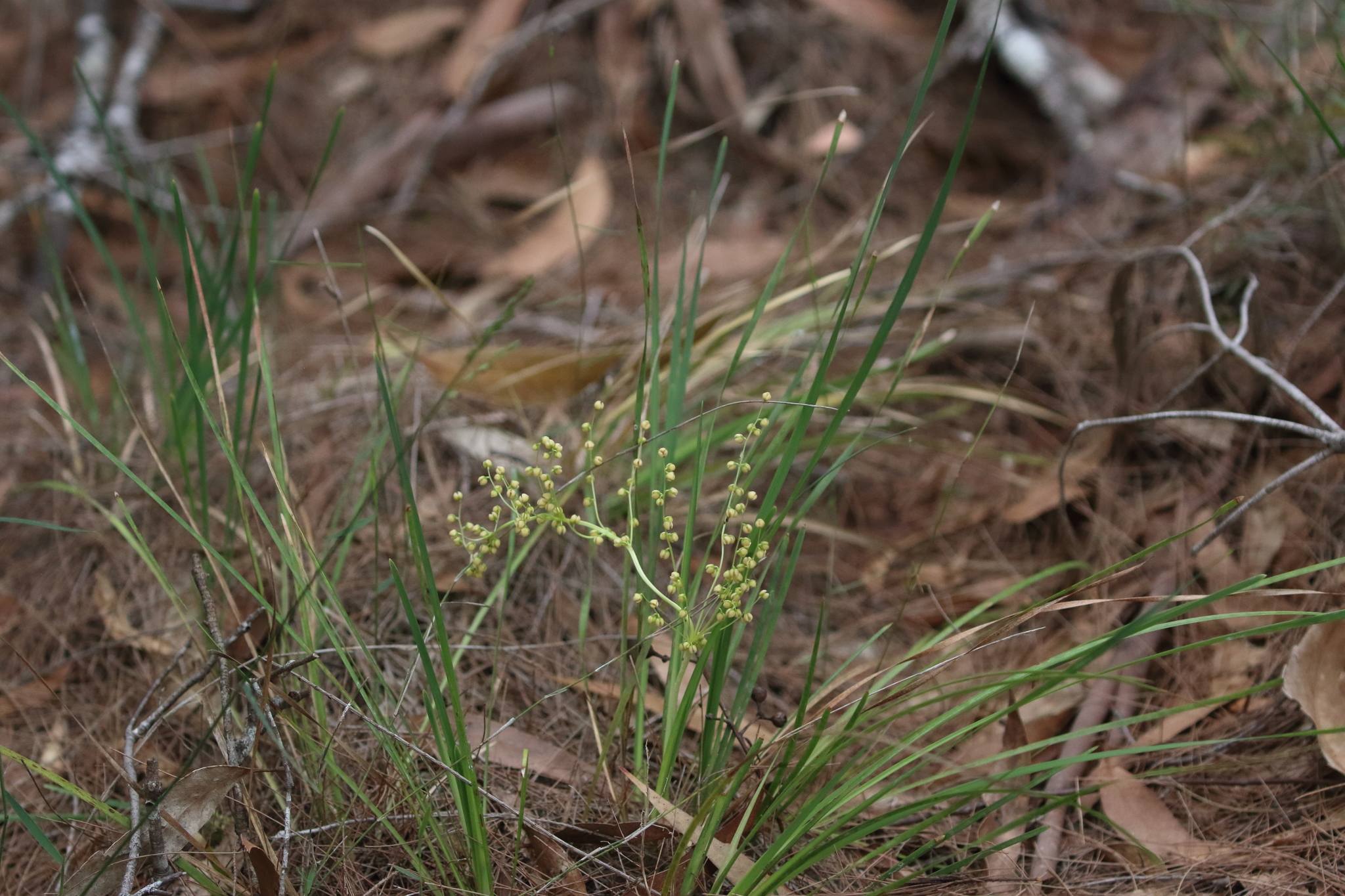

Scientific classification
- Kingdom: Plantae
- Clade: Embryophytes
- Clade: Tracheophytes
- Clade: Spermatophytes
- Clade: Angiosperms
- Clade: Monocots
- Order: Asparagales
- Family: Asparagaceae
- Subfamily: Lomandroideae
- Genus: Lomandra
- Species: L. laxa

Binomial name
- Lomandra laxa (R.Br.) A.T.Lee

Synonyms
- Xerotes laxa R.Br.

= Lomandra laxa =

Species of flowering plant

Lomandra laxa is a perennial, rhizomatous herb found in the Australian states of New South Wales and Queensland.

It was first described in 1810 as Xerotes laxa by Robert Brown, but in 1962 it was transferred to the genus, Lomandra, by Alma Theodora Lee.
