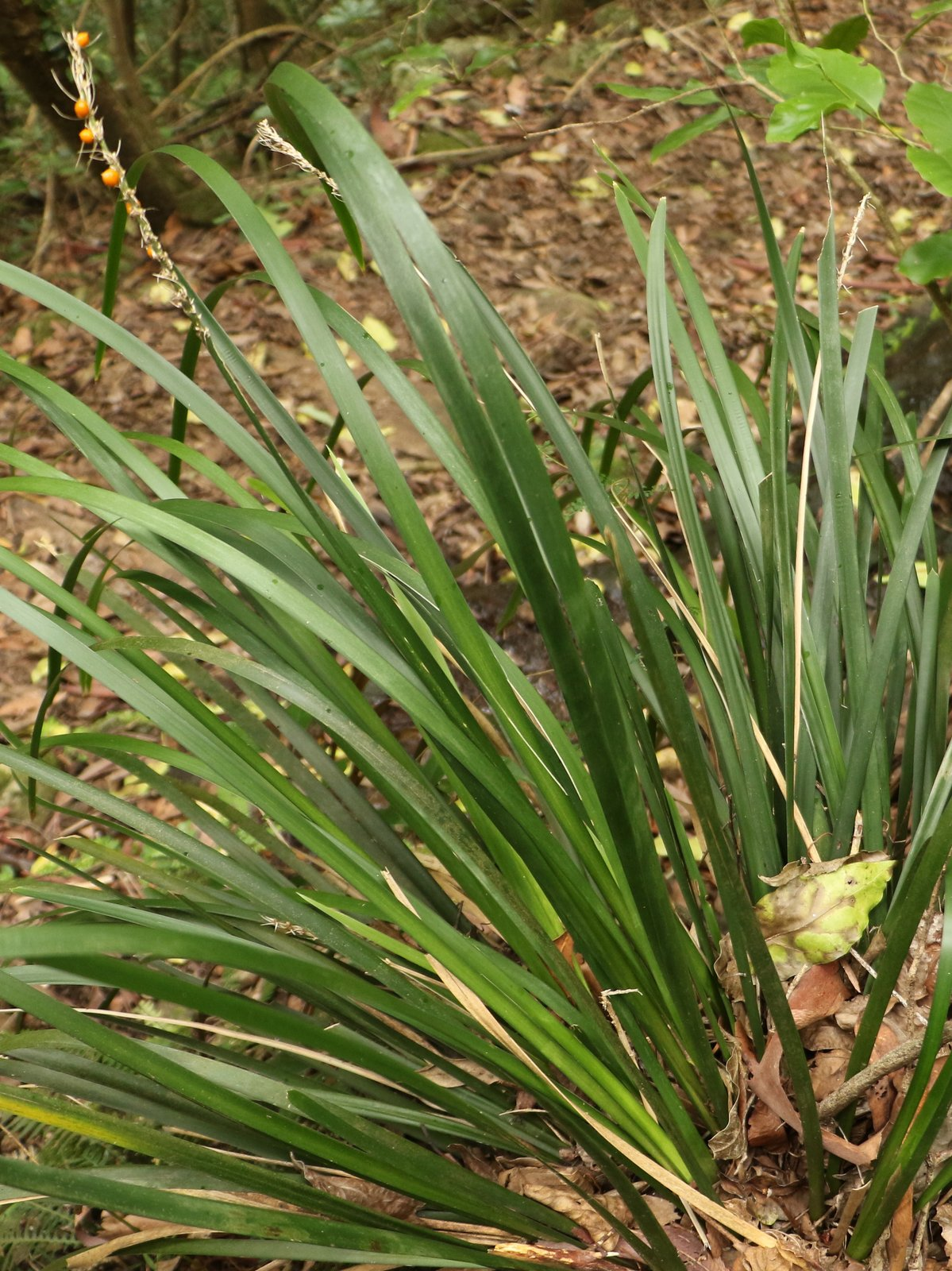
- Boorganna Nature Reserve

Scientific classification
- Kingdom: Plantae
- Clade: Tracheophytes
- Clade: Angiosperms
- Clade: Monocots
- Order: Asparagales
- Family: Asparagaceae
- Subfamily: Lomandroideae
- Genus: Lomandra
- Species: L. spicata

Binomial name
- Lomandra spicata A.T.Lee

= Lomandra spicata =

Species of flowering plant

Lomandra spicata is a rainforest flowering plant in the family Asparagaceae. It is found in eastern Australia.
