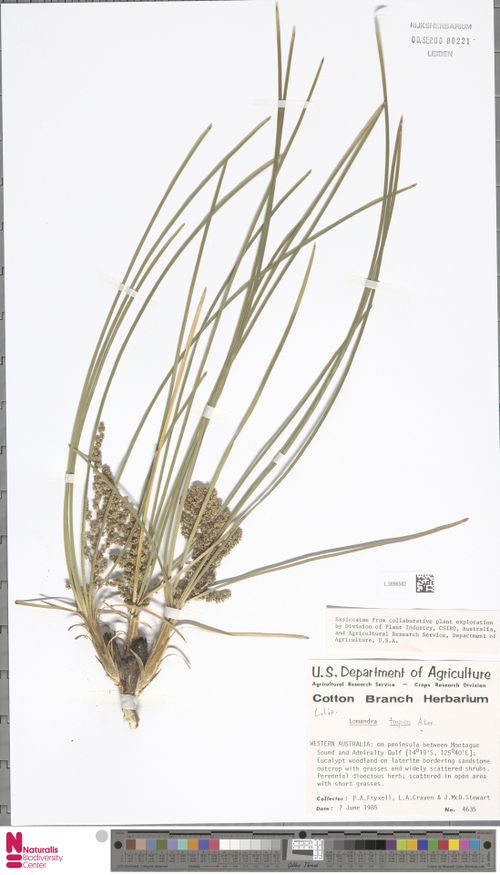

Scientific classification
- Kingdom: Plantae
- Clade: Tracheophytes
- Clade: Angiosperms
- Clade: Monocots
- Order: Asparagales
- Family: Asparagaceae
- Subfamily: Lomandroideae
- Genus: Lomandra
- Species: L. tropica

Binomial name
- Lomandra tropica A.T.Lee

= Lomandra tropica =

Species of flowering plant

Lomandra tropica is a perennial, rhizomatous herb found in northern Australia, in Western Australia and the Northern Territory.

It was first described in 1980 by Alma Theodora Lee.
