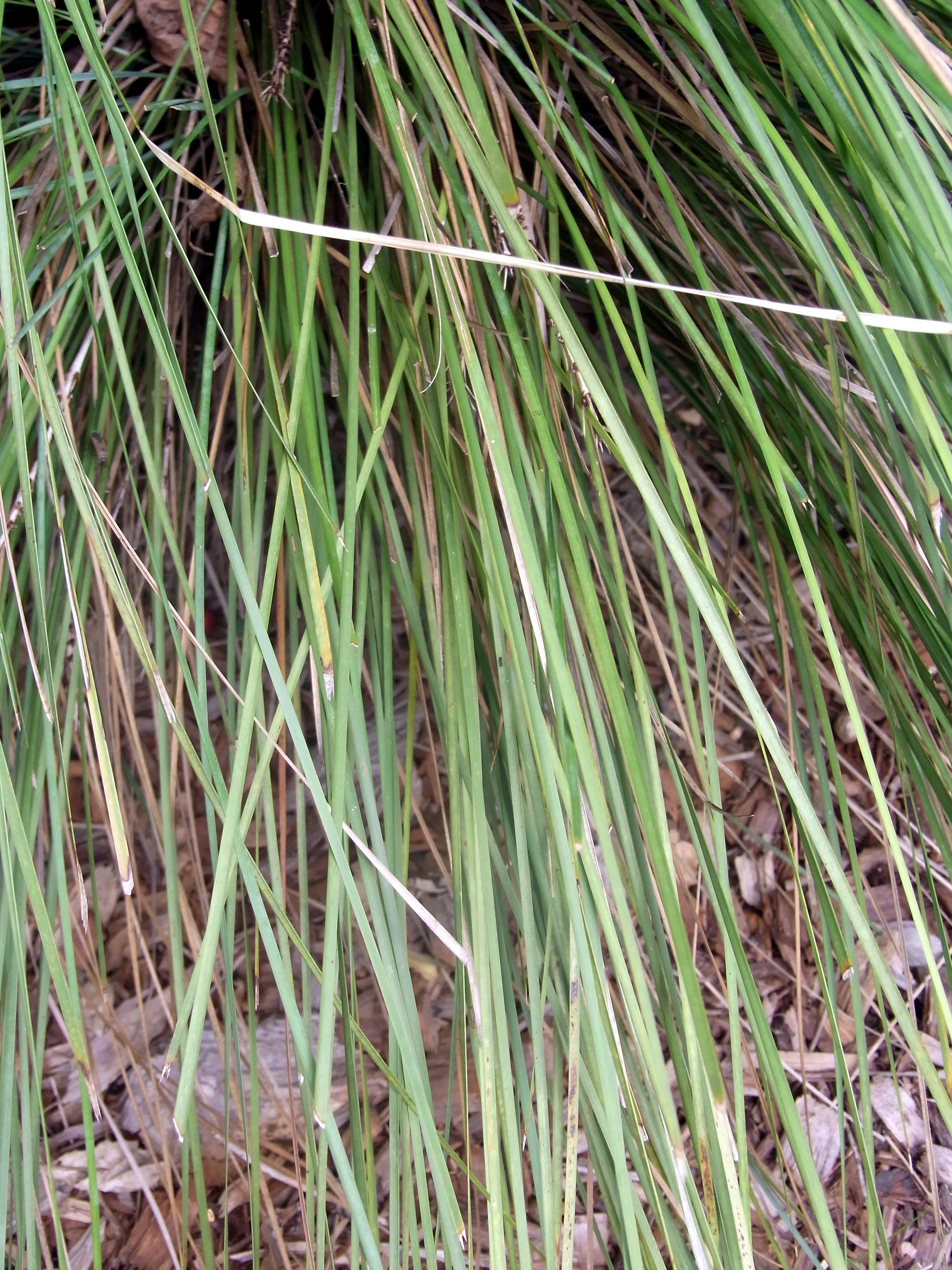
- Lomandra fluviatilis

Scientific classification
- Kingdom: Plantae
- Clade: Tracheophytes
- Clade: Angiosperms
- Clade: Monocots
- Order: Asparagales
- Family: Asparagaceae
- Subfamily: Lomandroideae
- Genus: Lomandra
- Species: L. fluviatilis

Binomial name
- Lomandra fluviatilis A.T.Lee

= Lomandra fluviatilis =

Species of flowering plant

Lomandra fluviatilis is a perennial, rhizomatous herb found in the Australian state of New South Wales.
