= Lomandra rigida =

Scientific classification
- Kingdom: Plantae
- Clade: Tracheophytes
- Clade: Angiosperms
- Clade: Monocots
- Order: Asparagales
- Family: Asparagaceae
- Subfamily: Lomandroideae
- Genus: Lomandra
- Species: L. rigida

Binomial name
- Lomandra rigida Labill.

Synonyms
- Xerotes rigida (Labill.) R.Br.

Species of plant

Lomandra rigida, commonly known as stiff mat rush, is a herbaceous perennial plant endemic to the southern coast of Southwest Australia.

== Taxonomy ==
First described by Jacques Labillardière in 1805, using specimens he obtained while voyaging along the Australian coast. The type specimen is noted as collected "in terrâ Van-Leuwin". The species was assigned to genus Xerotes by Robert Brown in 1810, this combination is currently regarded as a synonym for the original description.

== Description ==
A mat forming perennial plant, growing to a height between 0.1 and 0.3 metres. They are a dioecious species, separated as male and female individuals, that present cream or yellow flowers around October to December. The leaves terminate in a pair of spines.

== Ecology ==
Endemic to sand on granitic outcrops at the coast of the eastern Esperance Plains and offshore islands at the Recherche Archipelago. The dense and spiny mats formed by the plant provides habitat for other organisms and a deterrent to herbivores, the assemblage of plants may include Caladenia heberleana and Anthocercis vicosa subsp. caudata.
