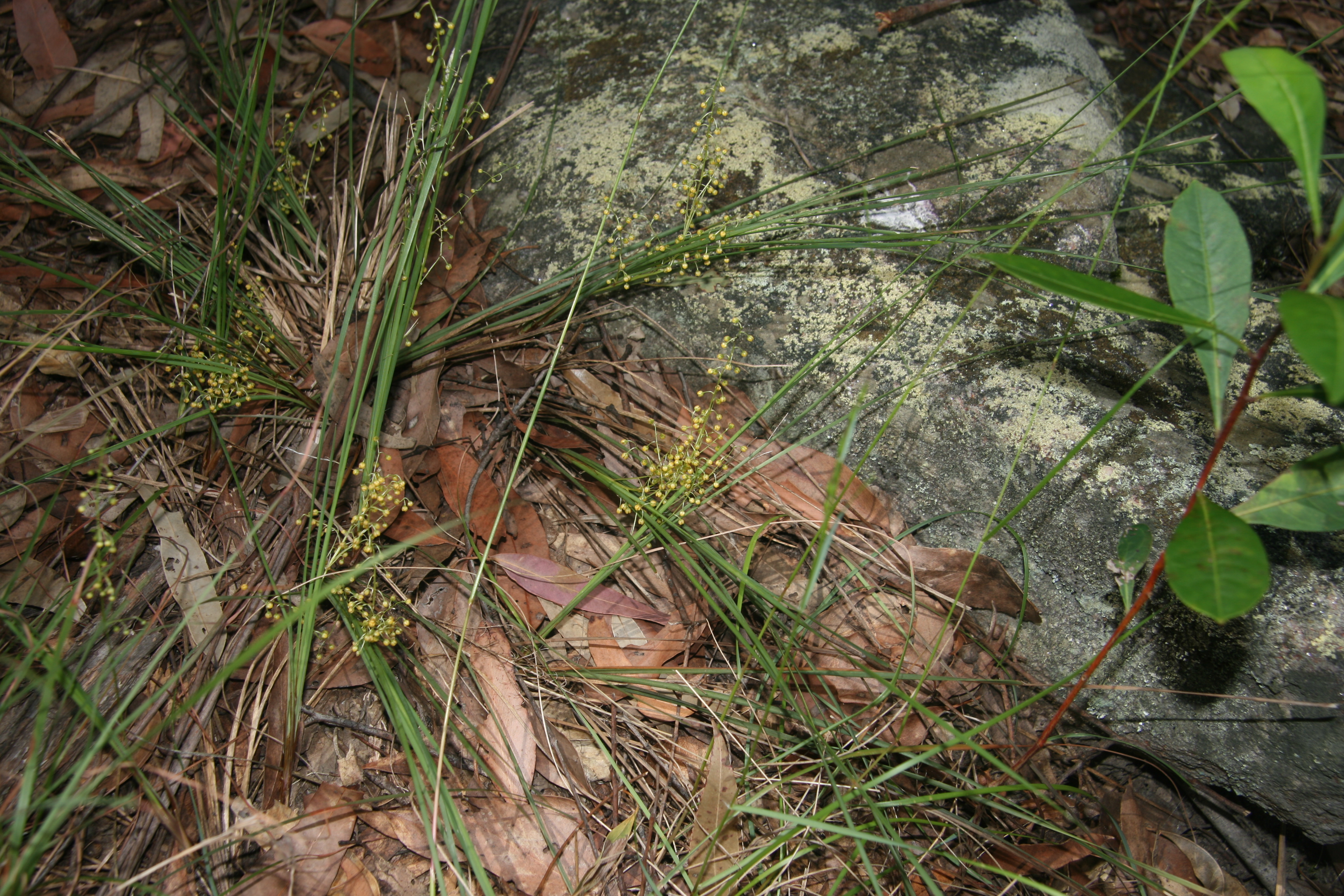

Scientific classification
- Kingdom: Plantae
- Clade: Tracheophytes
- Clade: Angiosperms
- Clade: Monocots
- Order: Asparagales
- Family: Asparagaceae
- Subfamily: Lomandroideae
- Genus: Lomandra
- Species: L. gracilis

Binomial name
- Lomandra gracilis (R.Br.) A.T.Lee

Synonyms
- Xerotes gracilis R.Br.

= Lomandra gracilis =

Species of flowering plant

Lomandra gracilis is a perennial, rhizomatous herb that is found in New South Wales and Queensland in eastern Australia.

It was first described in 1810 as Xerotes gracilis by Robert Brown, but was re-assigned to the genus, Lomandra, in 1962 by Alma Theodora Lee.
