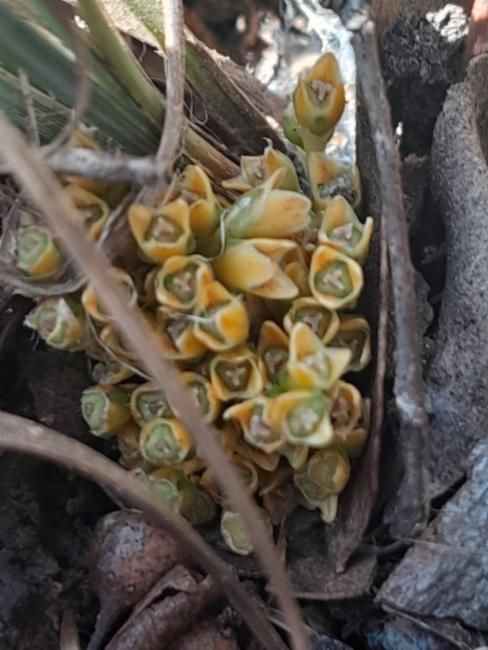
- Mount Majura, ACT

Scientific classification
- Kingdom: Plantae
- Clade: Tracheophytes
- Clade: Angiosperms
- Clade: Monocots
- Order: Asparagales
- Family: Asparagaceae
- Subfamily: Lomandroideae
- Genus: Lomandra
- Species: L. bracteata

Binomial name
- Lomandra bracteata A.T.Lee

= Lomandra bracteata =

Species of plant in the asparagus family

Lomandra bracteata is a species of plant in the Asparagaceae family, first described in 1962 by Alma Theodora Lee.

It is a perennial, subtropical plant, endemic to New South Wales.
