= Lomandra drummondii =

Scientific classification
- Kingdom: Plantae
- Clade: Tracheophytes
- Clade: Angiosperms
- Clade: Monocots
- Order: Asparagales
- Family: Asparagaceae
- Subfamily: Lomandroideae
- Genus: Lomandra
- Species: L. drummondii

Binomial name
- Lomandra drummondii (F.Muell. ex Benth.) Ewart

Species perennial herb plant

Lomandra drummondii is a species perennial herb plant, native to Southwestern Australia.
