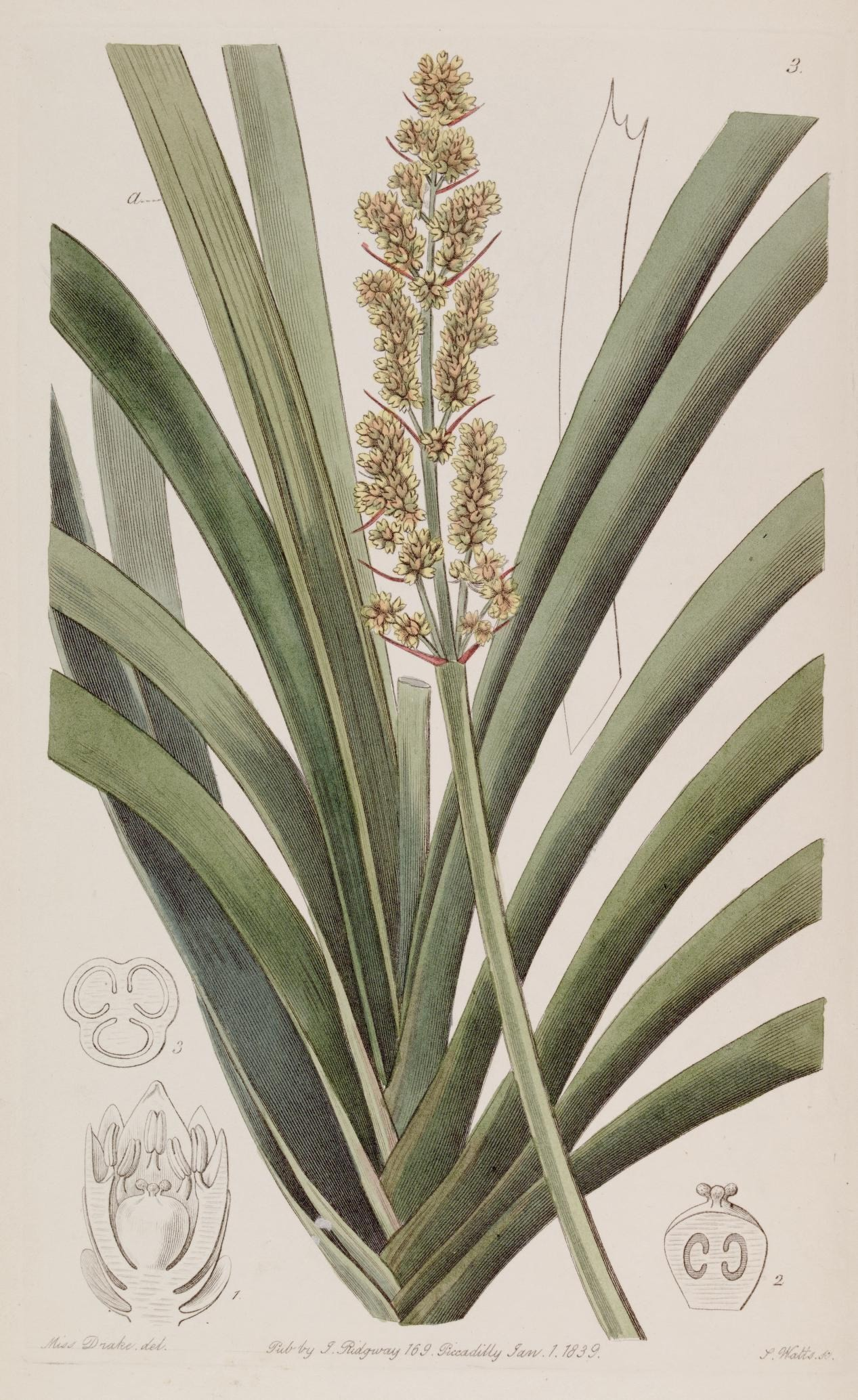
- Botanical illustration

Scientific classification
- Kingdom: Plantae
- Clade: Tracheophytes
- Clade: Angiosperms
- Clade: Monocots
- Order: Asparagales
- Family: Asparagaceae
- Subfamily: Lomandroideae
- Genus: Lomandra; Labill.

Species
- See text

Synonyms
- Xerotes R.Br.

= Lomandra =

Genus of flowering plants

Lomandra, commonly known as mat rushes, is a genus of perennial, herbaceous monocots in the family Asparagaceae, subfamily Lomandroideae. The genus was first described in 1805 by Jacques Labillardière.

There are 51 species, all of which are native to Australia; two of them also extend into New Guinea and New Caledonia.

They are generally tufted dioecious perennials with long narrow blade-like leaves that arise from a central stemless base and have thick woody rhizomes and fibrous roots.

== Taxonomy ==
Now in the Asparagaceae, this genus was formerly assigned to the family Dasypogonaceae, Xanthorrhoeaceae, or Liliaceae.

=== Species ===
According to Plants of the World Online, there are 64 species recognised as of June 2024:

- Lomandra acicularis M.D.Barrett
- Lomandra altior Jian Wang ter
- Lomandra banksii (R.Br.) Ewart
- Lomandra beaniana Jian Wang ter
- Lomandra bracteata A.T.Lee
- Lomandra brevis A.T.Lee
- Lomandra breviscapa Jian Wang ter
- Lomandra briggsiana R.L.Barrett & T.C.Wilson
- Lomandra brittanii T.S.Choo
- Lomandra caespitosa (Benth.) Ewart
- Lomandra collina (R.Br.) Ewart
- Lomandra confertifolia (F.M.Bailey) Fahn
- Lomandra cylindrica A.T.Lee
- Lomandra decomposita (R.Br.) Jian Wang ter & A.R.Bean
- Lomandra densiflora J.M.Black
- Lomandra drummondii (F.Muell. ex Benth.) Ewart
- Lomandra effusa (Lindl.) Ewart
- Lomandra elongata (Benth.) Ewart
- Lomandra fibrata J.M.Black
- Lomandra filiformis (Thunb.) Britten in J.Banks
- Lomandra fluviatilis (R.Br.) A.T.Lee
- Lomandra glauca (R.Br.) Ewart
- Lomandra gracilis (R.Br.) A.T.Lee
- Lomandra grayi Jian Wang ter
- Lomandra hastilis (R.Br.) Ewart
- Lomandra hermaphrodita (C.R.P.Andrews) C.A.Gardner
- Lomandra hispidula Jian Wang ter
- Lomandra hystrix (R.Br.) L.R.Fraser & Vickery
- Lomandra insularis Schltr.
- Lomandra integra T.D.Macfarl.
- Lomandra juncea (F.Muell.) Ewart
- Lomandra laxa (R.Br.) A.T.Lee
- Lomandra leucocephala (R.Br.) Ewart
- Lomandra longifolia Labill.
- Lomandra marginata T.D.Macfarl. & Conran
- Lomandra maritima T.S.Choo
- Lomandra micrantha (Endl.) Ewart
- Lomandra montana (R.Br.) L.R.Fraser & Vickery
- Lomandra mucronata (R.Br.) A.T.Lee
- Lomandra multiflora (R.Br.) Britten
- Lomandra nana (A.T.Lee) A.T.Lee
- Lomandra nigricans T.D.Macfarl.
- Lomandra nutans T.D.Macfarl.
- Lomandra obliqua (Thunb.) J.F.Macbr.
- Lomandra odora (Endl.) Ewart
- Lomandra ordii (F.Muell.) Ewart
- Lomandra oreophila B.J.Conn & A.L.Quirico
- Lomandra patens A.T.Lee
- Lomandra pauciflora (R.Br.) Ewart
- Lomandra phillipsiorum Jian Wang ter
- Lomandra preissii (Endl.) Ewart
- Lomandra purpurea (Endl.) Ewart
- Lomandra ramosissima Jian Wang ter
- Lomandra rigida Labill.
- Lomandra rupestris (Endl.) Ewart
- Lomandra sericea (Endl.) Ewart
- Lomandra sonderi (F.Muell.) Ewart
- Lomandra sororia (F.Muell. ex Benth.) Ewart
- Lomandra spartea (Endl.) Ewart
- Lomandra spicata A.T.Lee
- Lomandra suaveolens (Endl.) Ewart
- Lomandra teres T.D.Macfarl.
- Lomandra tropica A.T.Lee
- Lomandra whicherensis Keighery
