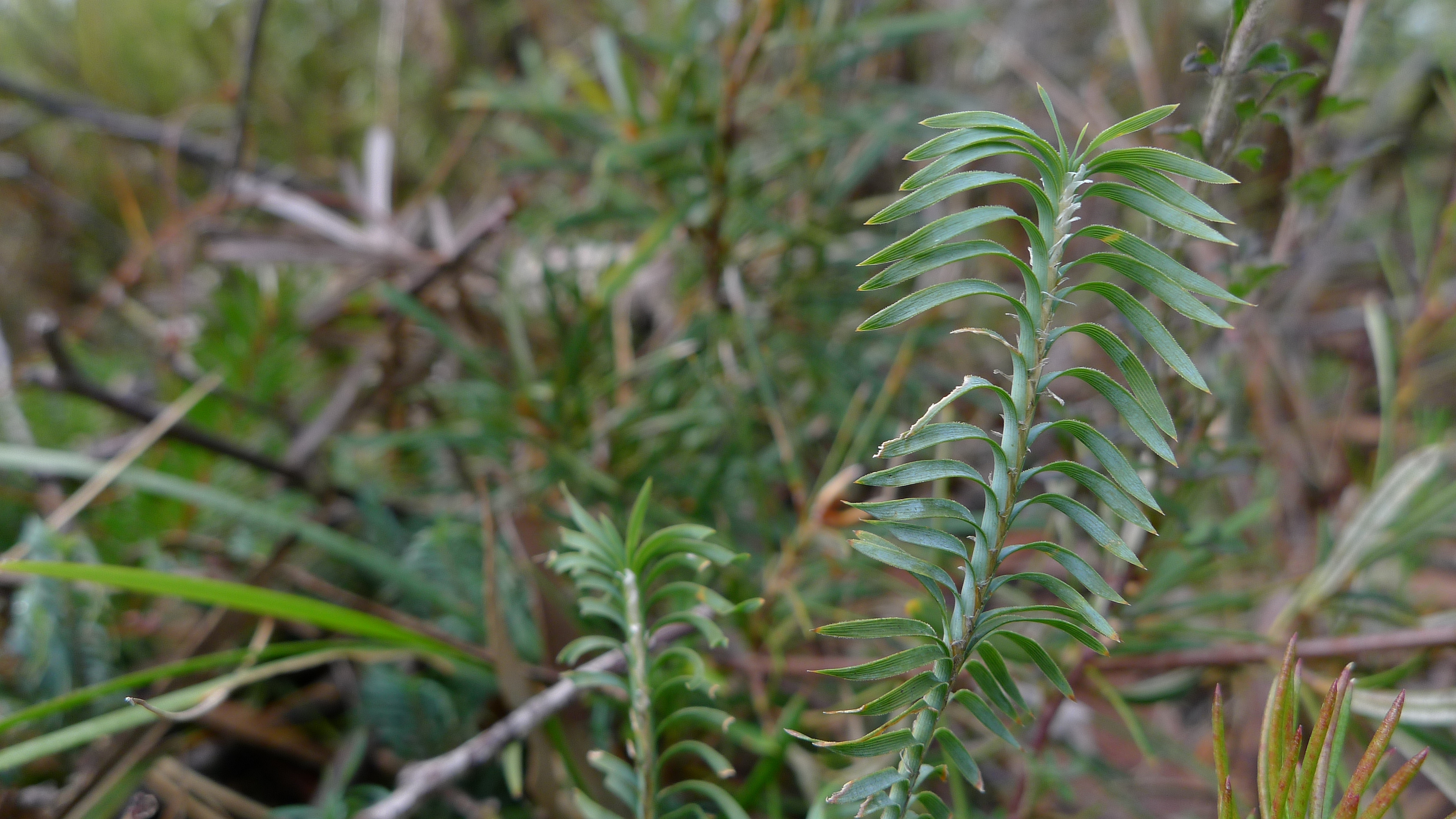

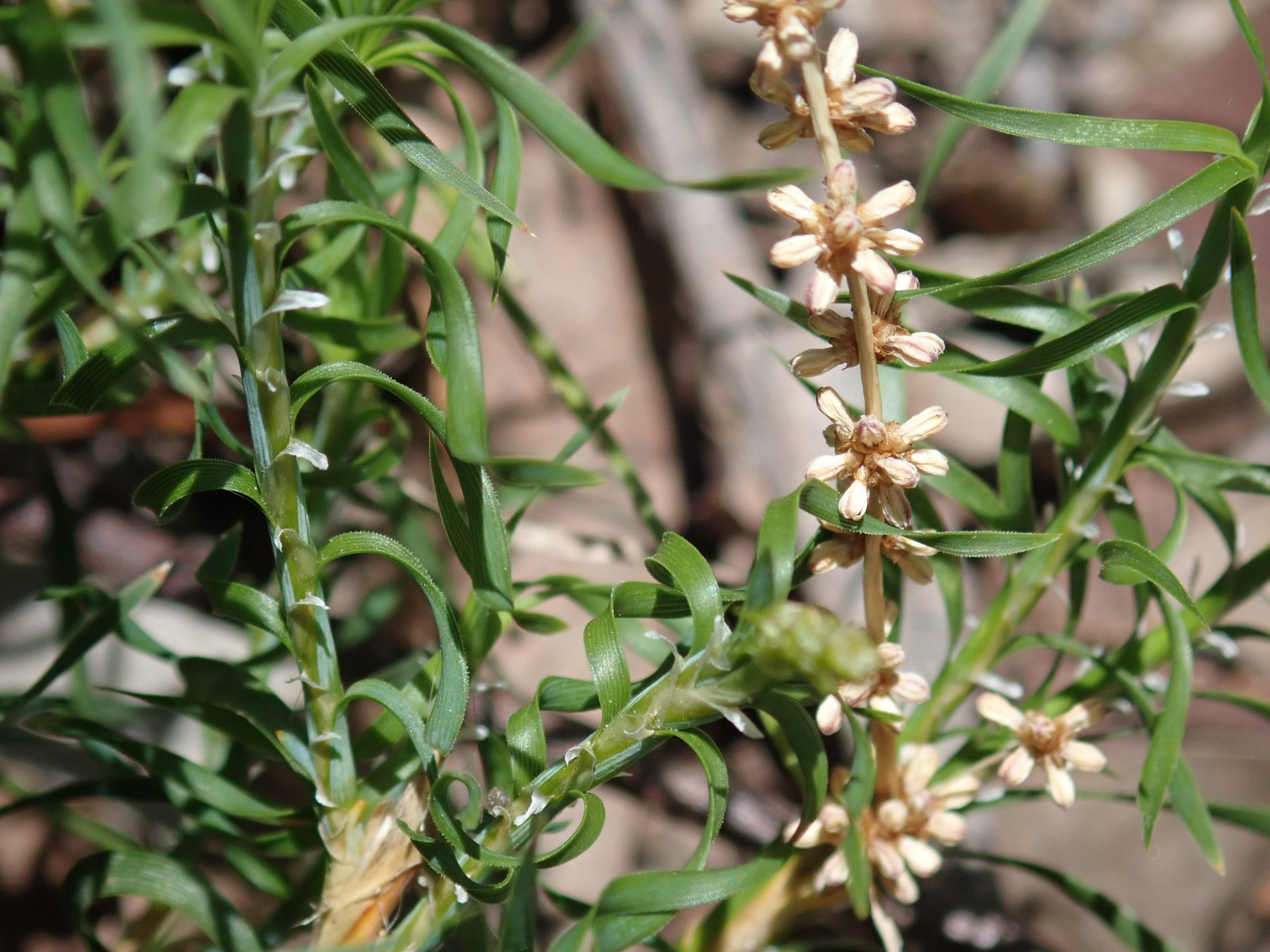

Scientific classification
- Kingdom: Plantae
- Clade: Tracheophytes
- Clade: Angiosperms
- Clade: Monocots
- Order: Asparagales
- Family: Asparagaceae
- Subfamily: Lomandroideae
- Genus: Lomandra
- Species: L. obliqua

Binomial name
- Lomandra obliqua (Thunb.) J.F.Macbr.
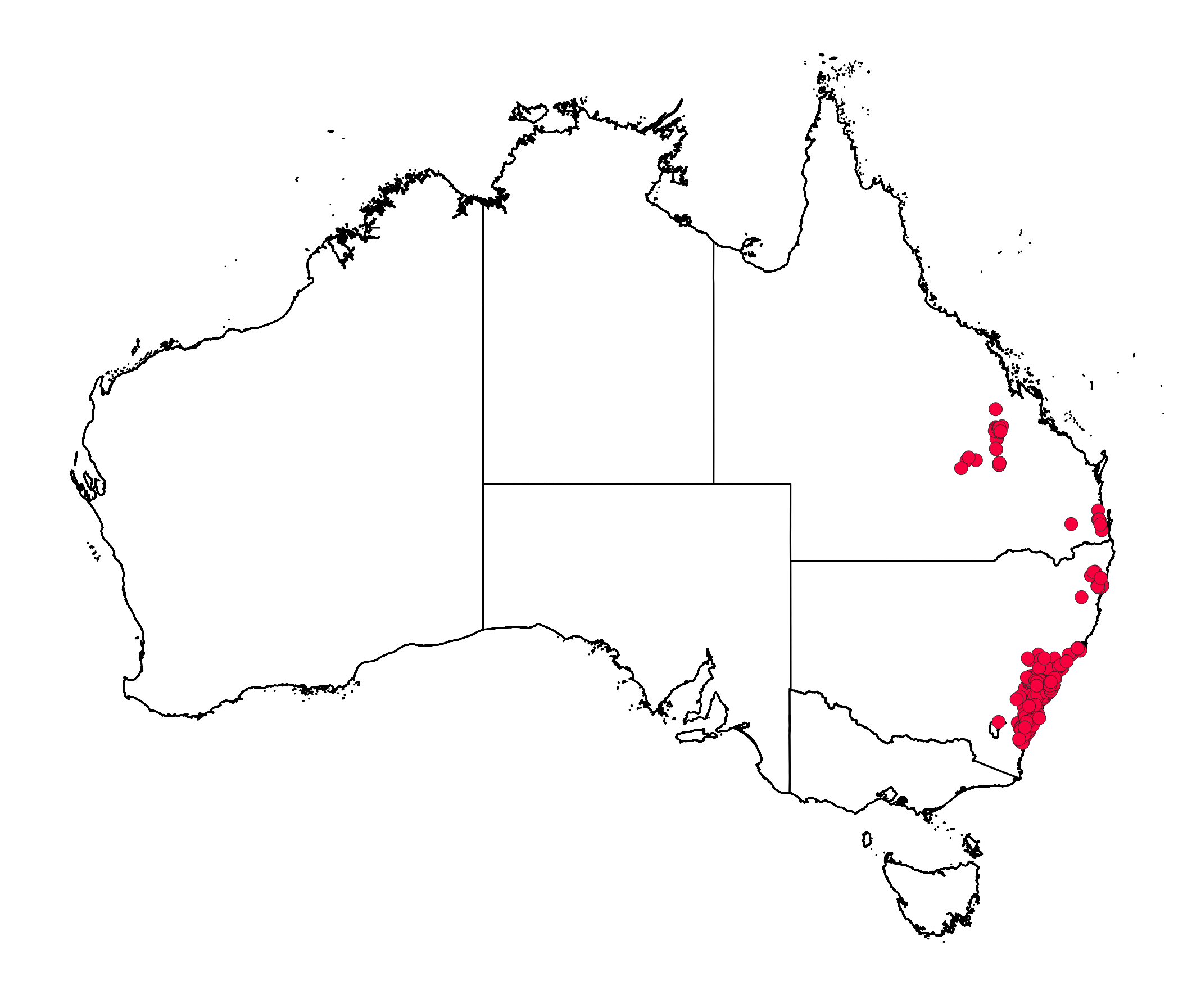
- Occurrence data from AVH

Synonyms
- Dracaena obliqua Thunb.; Lomandra flexifolia (R.Br.) Ewart; Xerotes flexifolia R.Br. nom. illeg.; Xerotes obliqua (Thunb.) Domin

= Lomandra obliqua =

Species of flowering plant

Lomandra obliqua, known as fish bones and twisted mat-rush, is a small wiry ground-covering flowering plant found in eastern Australia (in Queensland and New South Wales). It is a widespread plant seen on the coast and tablelands. The foliage superficially resembles a fern, but creamy/yellow flowers form on clusters in spring. Leaves are two-ranked, somewhat glaucous and twisted.

The habitat is heathland on sandstone soils, open forest or eucalyptus woodland.

== Taxonomy and naming ==
L. obliqua was first described by Carl Peter Thunberg in 1808 as Dracaena obliqua. It was redescribed by James Francis Macbride in 1918 as Lomandra obliqua. The specific epithet obliqua refers to the asymmetrical leaves.
