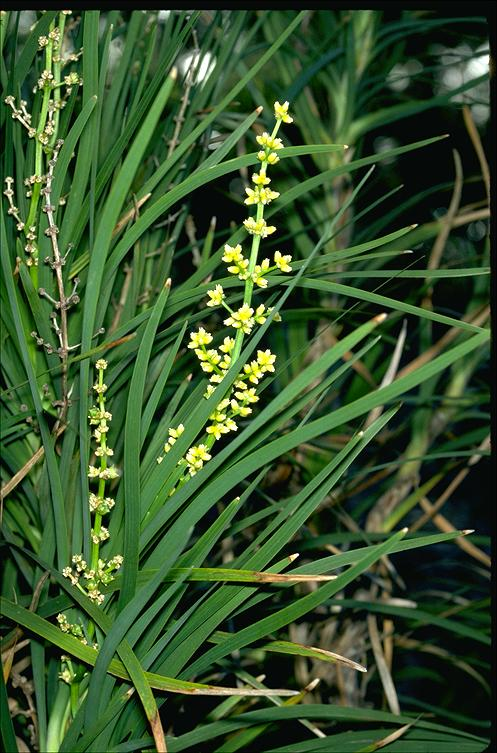
- Flowering at Australian Botanic Garden Mount Annan, New South Wales

Conservation status
- Least Concern (NCA)

Scientific classification
- Kingdom: Plantae
- Clade: Embryophytes
- Clade: Tracheophytes
- Clade: Spermatophytes
- Clade: Angiosperms
- Clade: Monocots
- Order: Asparagales
- Family: Asparagaceae
- Subfamily: Lomandroideae
- Genus: Lomandra
- Species: L. banksii

Binomial name
- Lomandra banksii Lauterb.

Synonyms
- Xerotes banksii R.Br.

= Lomandra banksii =

Species of flowering plant

Lomandra banksii, commonly known in Australia as clumping mat-rush, cocky's bootlace or iron grass, is a species of plant in the asparagus family Asparagaceae. It is native to New Guinea, New Caledonia and the state of Queensland, Australia.

== Description ==
=== Stem and foliage ===
Lomandra banksii is a shrub up to 2 m (6 ft 7 in) tall, beginning to flower when about one metre tall. Leaves are long and narrow, up to 30 cm (12 in) long by 8 mm (0.31 in) wide, arranged in tight whorls around the stem. They have numerous longitudinal veins and very fine serrations on the edges; the leaf tip is blunt with one to three indistinct teeth. The leaves separate from the stem close to the leaf base, and the base remains attached to the stem for some time.

=== Flowers ===
The inflorescence is terminal and about 35 cm (14 in) long, with successive whorls of flower-carrying branches more than 2 cm (0.79 in) apart. This species is dioecious, meaning that pistillate (functionally female) and staminate (functionally male) flowers are borne on separate plants. All flowers are sessile (without a stem) and have six tepals in two whorls of three; male tepals measure up to 3 mm (0.12 in) long and female tepals are up to 5 mm (0.20 in) long.

=== Fruit ===
The fruit is a capsule about 9 mm (0.35 in) long by 7 mm (0.28 in) wide, with the tepals remaining attached at the base and a sharp point at the apex. They have three segments, each containing a single seed coated in a red aril.

== Distribution and habitat ==
In Queensland it occurs on the northeast coast from near Cardwell to the top of Cape York Peninsula. It is also found in southern New Guinea and New Caledonia. It grows in vine thickets, open forests and on the edges of rainforest. In Queensland it can be found up to about 50 m (160 ft) above sea level.

== Conservation ==
This species is listed as least concern under the Queensland Government's Nature Conservation Act. As of June 2026, it has not been assessed by the International Union for Conservation of Nature.

== Gallery ==
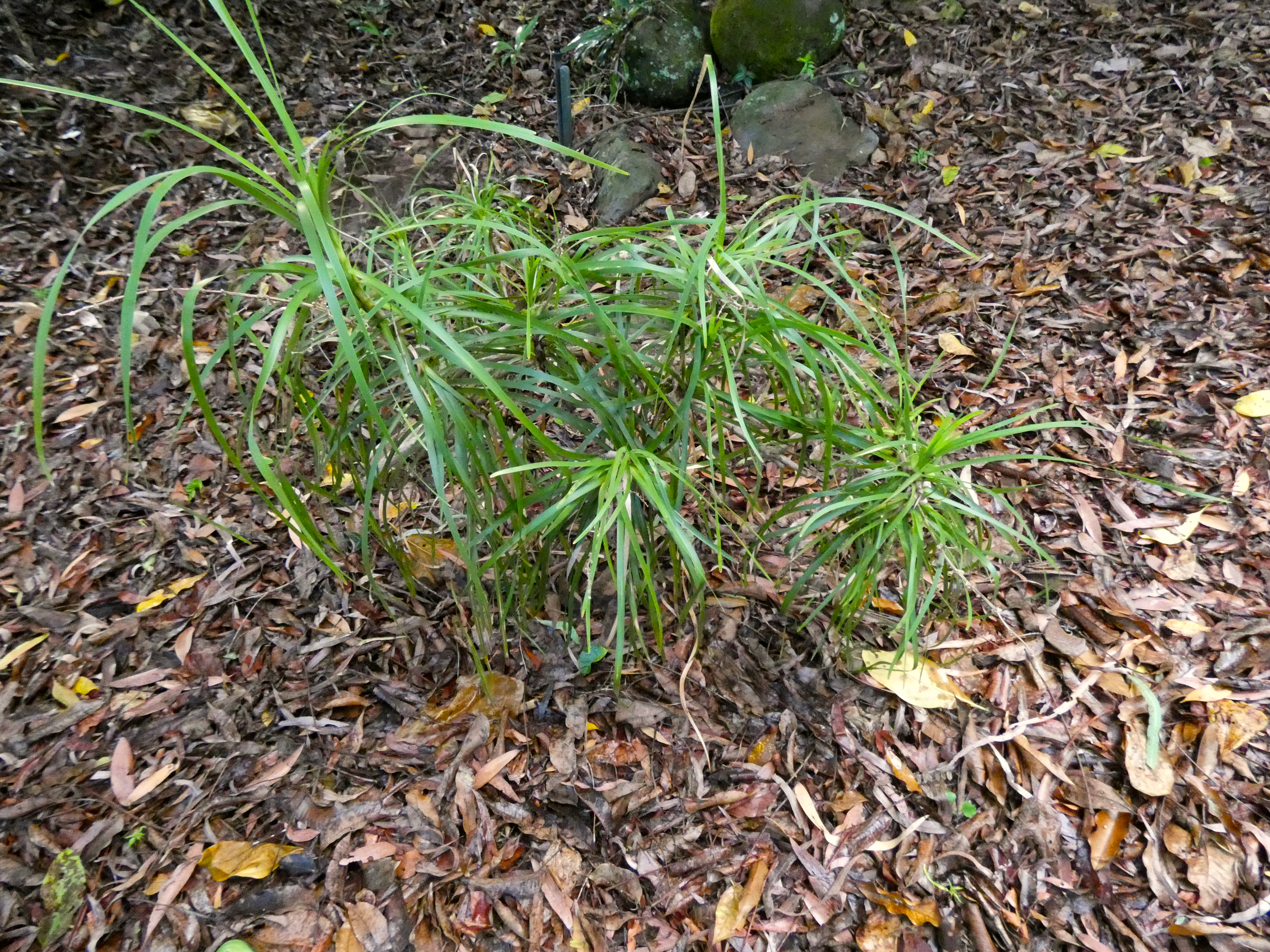
Habit

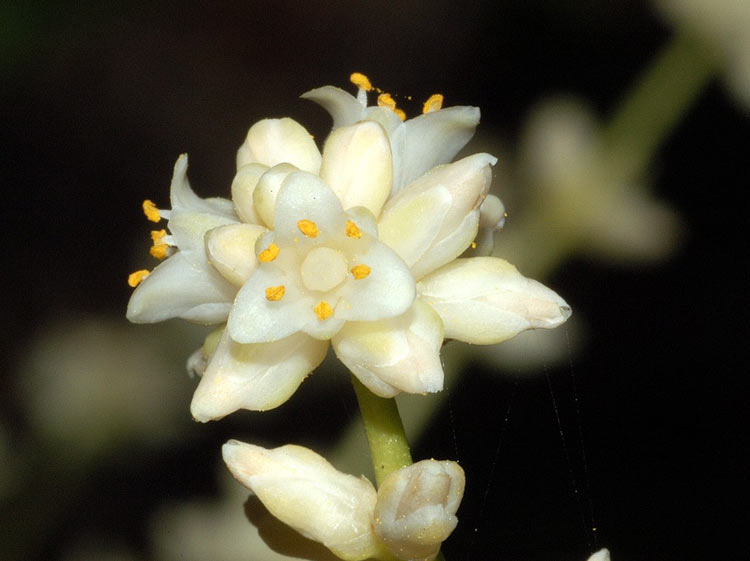
Flower

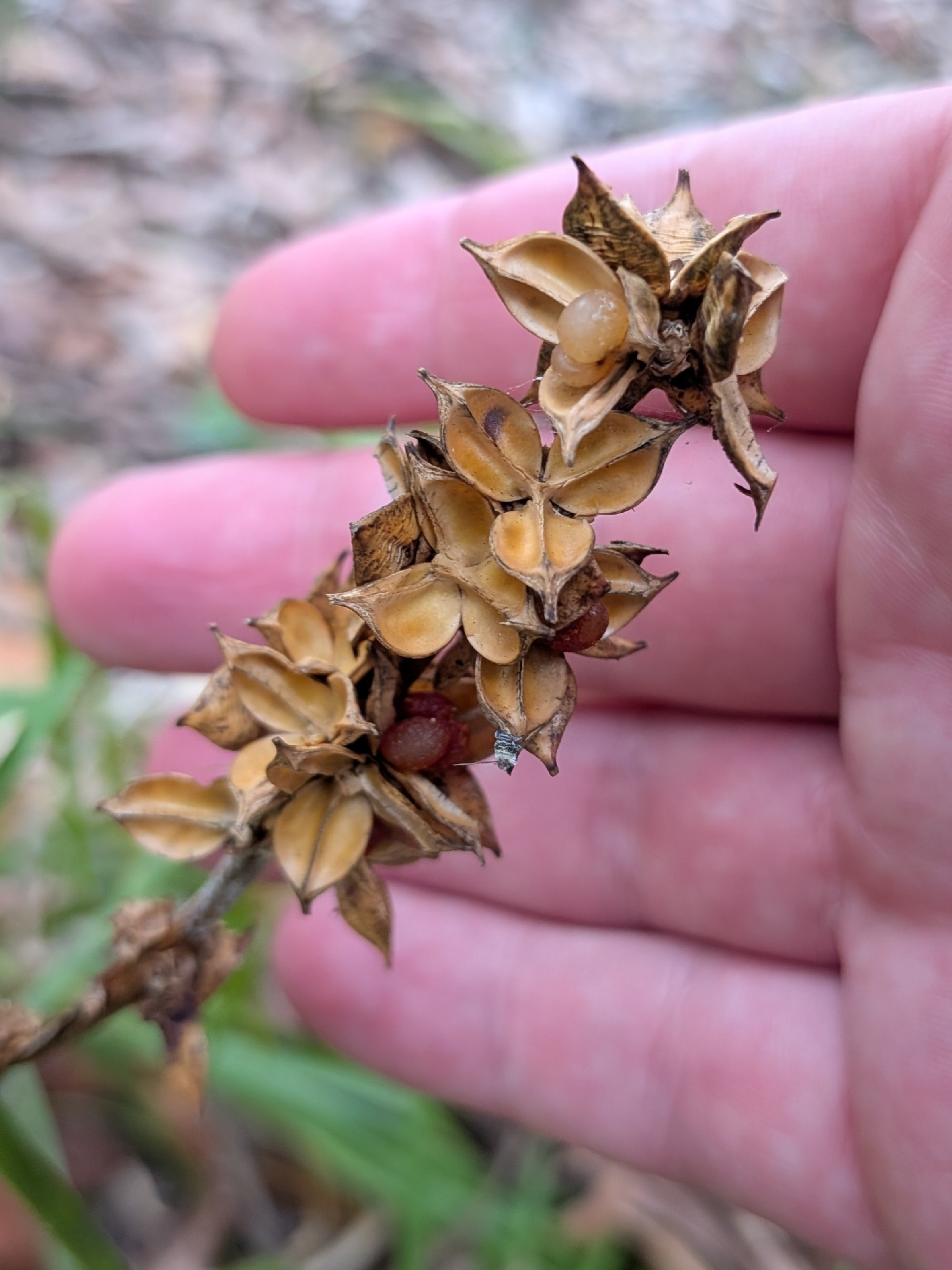
Dehisced fruit
