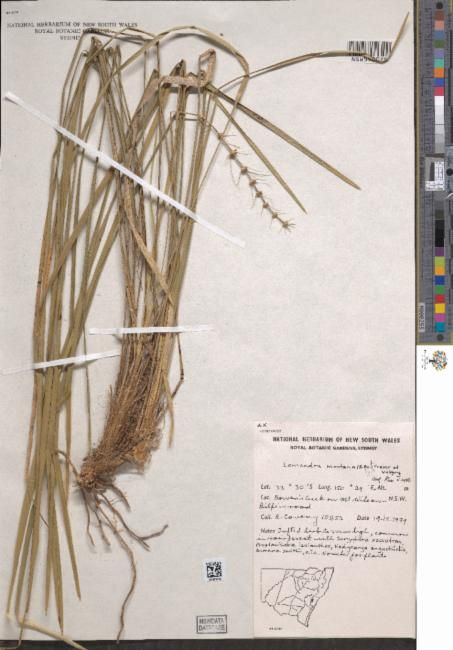
- NSW598075

Scientific classification
- Kingdom: Plantae
- Clade: Tracheophytes
- Clade: Angiosperms
- Clade: Monocots
- Order: Asparagales
- Family: Asparagaceae
- Subfamily: Lomandroideae
- Genus: Lomandra
- Species: L. montana

Binomial name
- Lomandra montana (R.Br.) L.R.Fraser & Vickery

Synonyms
- Xerotes montana R.Br. Xerotes longifolia var. montana (R.Br.) F.M.Bailey

= Lomandra montana =

Species of flowering plant

Lomandra montana (common name - Blue Mountains mat-rush) is a perennial, rhizomatous herb found in eastern Australia.

== Description ==
This is a tufted plant with leaves from 35 – 50 cm long and 2–4 mm wide. The male and female inflorescences are unbranched and much shorter than the leaves, and the flower clusters occur in whorls

== Distribution ==
It is found near creeks and waterfalls.

== Taxonomy ==
Lomandra montana was first described in 1810 by Robert Brown as Xerotes montana. In 1937 it was transferred to the genus, Lomandra, by Lilian Ross Fraser and Joyce Winifred Vickery, to give the current name. It was also renamed as the variety Xerotes longifolia var montana by Frederick Manson Bailey in 1912, but this name is considered to be a synonym only.
