= Lomandra maritima =

Scientific classification
- Kingdom: Plantae
- Clade: Tracheophytes
- Clade: Angiosperms
- Clade: Monocots
- Order: Asparagales
- Family: Asparagaceae
- Subfamily: Lomandroideae
- Genus: Lomandra
- Species: L. maritima

Binomial name
- Lomandra maritima T.S.Choo

Species of flowering plant

Lomandra maritima is a species of flowering plant in the family Asparagaceae.
