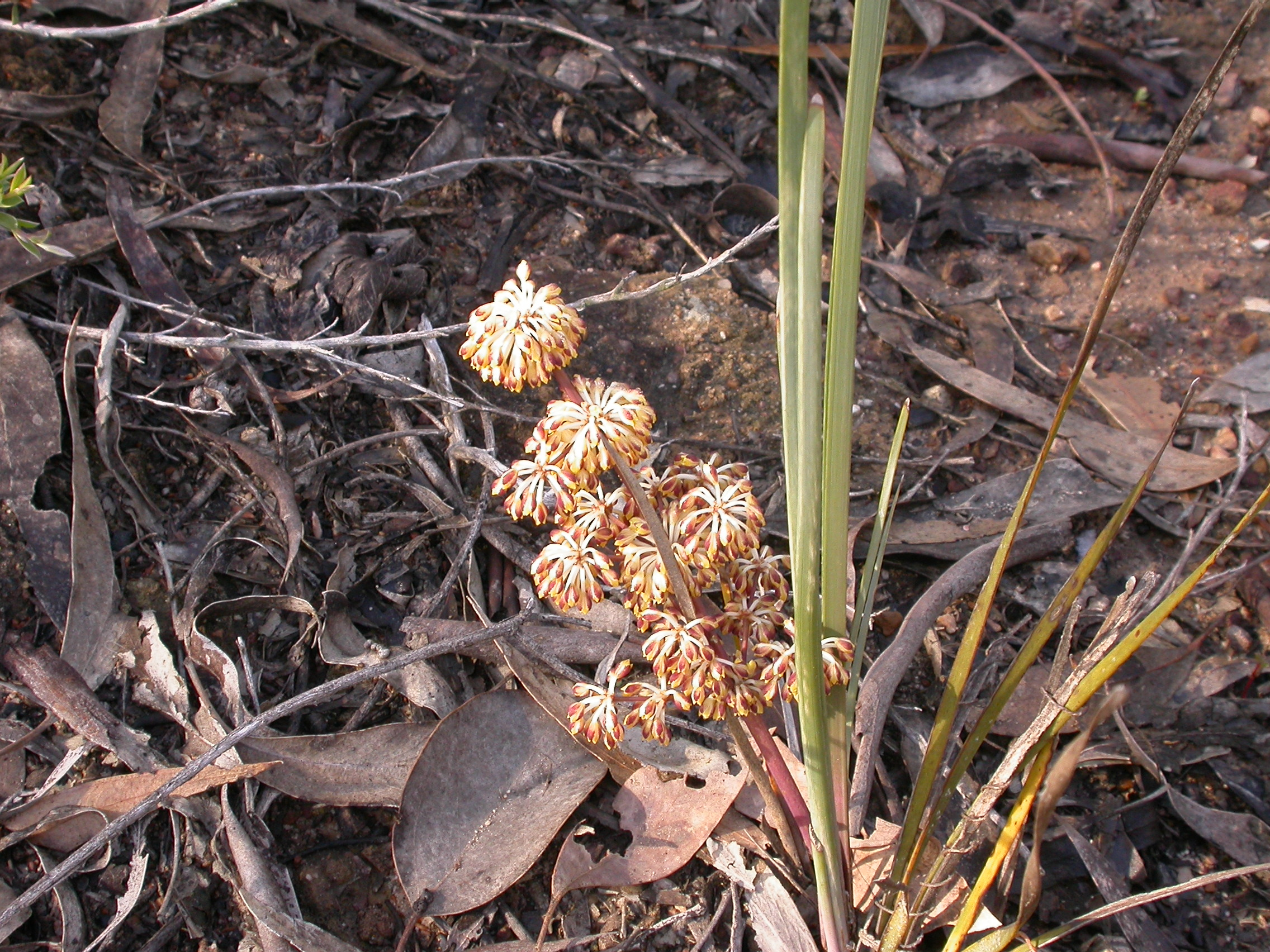

Scientific classification
- Kingdom: Plantae
- Clade: Embryophytes
- Clade: Tracheophytes
- Clade: Spermatophytes
- Clade: Angiosperms
- Clade: Monocots
- Order: Asparagales
- Family: Asparagaceae
- Subfamily: Lomandroideae
- Genus: Lomandra
- Species: L. multiflora

Binomial name
- Lomandra multiflora (R.Br.) Britten

= Lomandra multiflora =

Species of plant in Asparagaceae family

Lomandra multiflora, also commonly known as many-flowered mat rush, mat rush and many flowered mat-lily, is a perennial, rhizomatous herb found in Australia and Papua New Guinea. The mat rush is distributed widely in the region and common within its preferred growing conditions. Its conservation status is considered not to be of concern and risk.

There are two subspecies of Lomandra multiflora, known as Lomandra multiflora subspecies dura and subspecies multiflora. Lomandra multiflora is a small grass-like plant with long flat yellowish green leaves that are typically 30–50 cm long. A distinct feature about Lomandra multiflora is that they are a dioecious plant. The flower of the plant is a creamy yellow colour. The male flowers are smaller than the female flowers and grow on a branched stem, unlike the female flowers.

Lomandra multiflora grows chiefly in woodland and open forest on a variety of soils. The plant is fire-retardant and can withstand a range of climates, making it ideal to grow in gardens. Lomandra multiflora is historically used for basket making and other forms of weaving. The plant is a food for native Australian butterflies, caterpillars, and moths. The seed of the plant is also a source of food for birds, skinks, and lizards.

== Description ==
Lomandra multiflora, commonly known as many-flowered mat-rush, mat rush or many-flowered mat-lily is a tufted perennial, rhizomatous herb native to Australia. Lomandra multiflora is part of the Lomandra genus with around 50 species, all of which are native to Australia and generally share common characteristics. There are two subspecies, Lomandra multiflora subspecies dura, also known as stiff iron grass, and subspecies multiflora.

Lomandra multiflora is a small grass-like tussocky plant with long flat rigid yellowish green leaves that are typically 30 to 50 cm long but can grow from a range of 25cm to 90 cm long. The flat smooth leaves grow vertically and are rounded at the apex, often slightly concave or convex, around 2.5 to 4 cm wide. The margins of the leaf are brown, dry and membranous in texture which is slightly rough to the touch.

The subspecies multiflora has stiff narrow leaves that grow 25–90 cm long, while subspecies dura has strap like leaves about 40cm tall. Lomandra multiflora subspecies dura also differs from subspecies multiflora in the flowers being more hidden in the hard bracts of the plant.

They are a diecious plant, meaning the male and female flowers are carried on separate plants, which is a distinct feature of the plant. During spring, the flowers show a creamy yellow colour which are arranged in clusters around the base of the leaves. The flowers have 6 petals, the inner petals are usually yellow and the outer petals reddish brown. The flowers grow in dense clusters on branch or unbranched spikes often 25–75 cm with spiky white bracts. The male stalked and bell-shaped flowers are smaller than the female stalkless flowers. The male flowers grow on a branched stem whereas the female occur on unbranched.

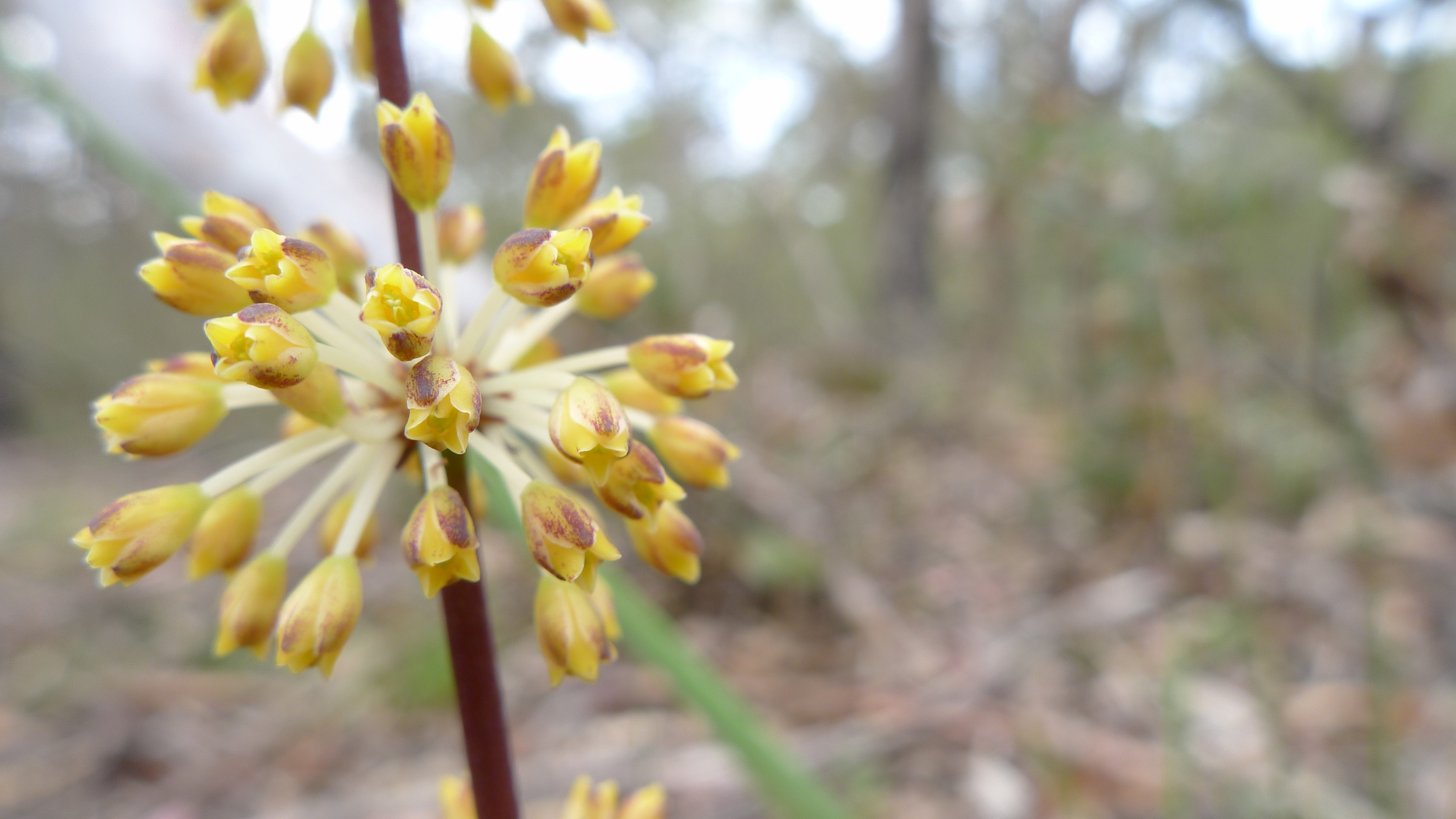
Lomandra mutliflora male flowers

Lomandra multiflora’s staminate inflorescence, which is the closely grouped arrangement of the male flowers, is around 50–60 cm tall with whorled branches between 2 and 5.5 cm. The flowers are a greenish yellow colour with 6 tepals, the 3 outer tepal are around 1 mm long and 0.7–0.8 mm wide, the 3 inner tepals are approximately 0.8 mm long and 0.5 mm wide and thicker than the outer tepals. The pistillate inflorescence, which is the female flower, is unbranched and around 28–30 cm long. The clusters of flowers in whorls of up to 6 is measured to be up to 7.5mm long. The 3 outer tepals are around 3.1mm long and 2.9mm wide, the inner 3 tepals are 2.5 mm long and 1.5 mm wide.

The fruit of Lomandra multiflora is a loculicidal capsule. At maturity, the capsule generally contains a single seed that is asymmetrical, around 6–6.5mm long, 3.3–4mm across and 5mm deep. When the seed is dry, it is a grayish brown colour with distant transverse wrinkles.

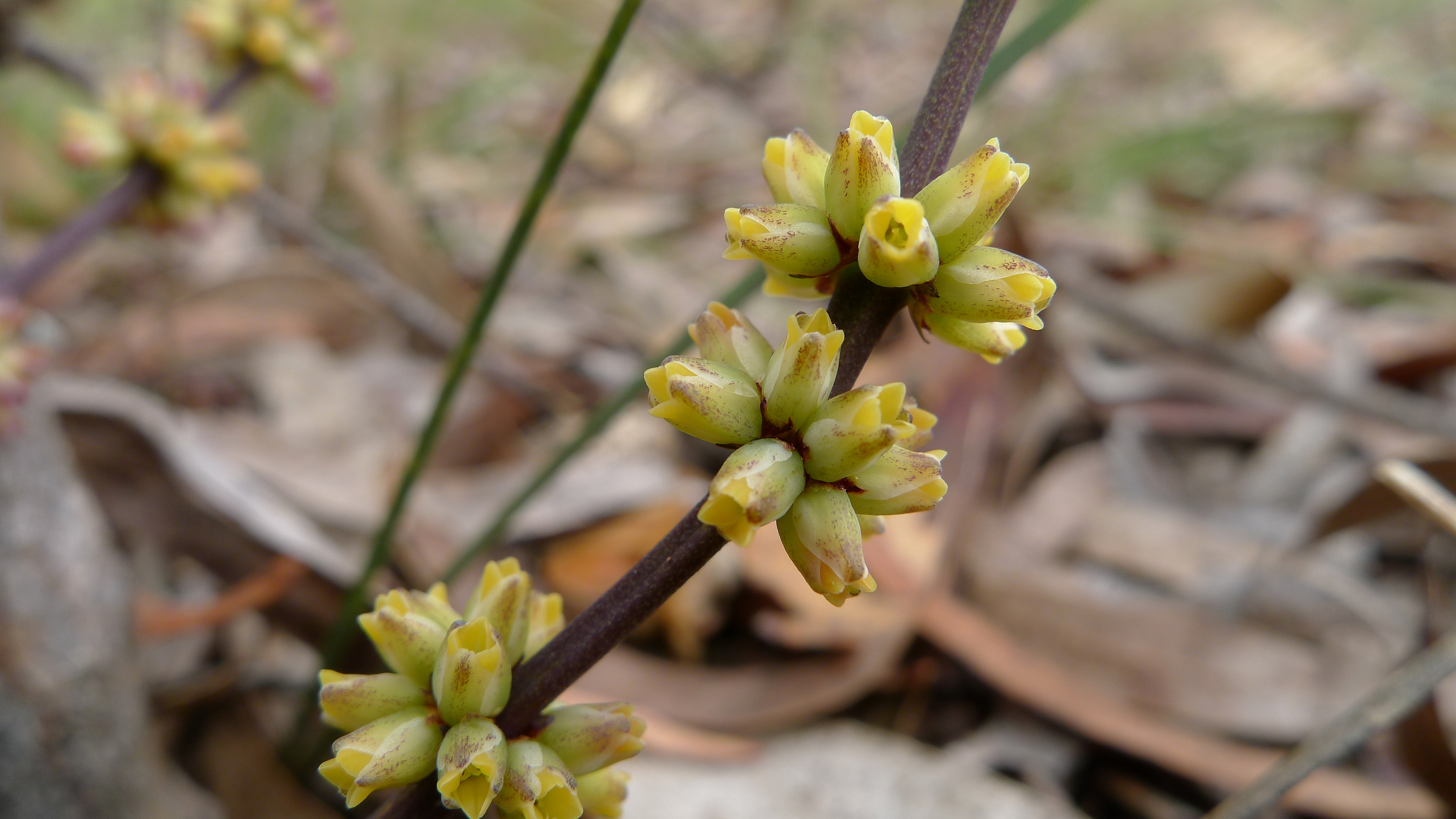
Lomandra multiflora female flowers

Lomandra multiflora share very similar features with other species in the Lomandra genus, including Lomandra patens and Lomandra ramosissima. They are all robust plants forming tussocks with rounded to obtuse leaves without teeth and male flowers that from clusters that branch in whorls. However, Lomandra Ramosissima can be differentiated from Lomandra multiflora by the more branched female inflorescence and much shorter male flowers.

== Taxonomy ==
=== Taxonomic history ===
The name for Lomandra multiflora was formally published in Britten, J. in Banks, J. & Solander, D.C (1905), Illustrations of Australian plants collected in 1770 during Captain Cooks voyage round the world 3. The obsolete or synonym name for Lomandra multiflora is Xerotes mutliflora and Xerotes multiflora var. typicum Domin, which was published in Brown, R. (1810), Prodromus florae Novae Hollandiae et insulae Van-Diemen, exhibens characters plantarum quas annis 1802-1805. The scientific name was then reallocated to Lomandra multiflora (R.Br.) Britten by taxonomy builder.

=== Modern classification ===
The binomial classification of the plant is Lomandra multiflora. There are two subspecies, Lomandra multiflora subspecies dura and Lomandra multiflora subspecies multiflora. The common names of Lomandra multiflora include many-flowered mat-rush, mat rush or many-flowered mat-lily. The common name for Lomandra multiflora subspecies dura is stiff iron-grass. Lomandra multiflora subspecies multiflora is also commonly known as many-flowered mat-rush and many-flowered mat-lily.

=== Etymology ===
The genus name Lomandra is derived from the Greek words loma meaning edge or margin and andros meaning male, which is a reference to a circular margin on the anthers, which is the male part of the plant. The specific name multiflora comes from the Latin word multi meaning many, and flora meaning flower which refers to the flowering nature of the plant.

== Distribution and habitat ==
Lomandra multiflora is found in New South Wales, Queensland, Victoria, South Australia, Northern Territory of Australia and also in Papua New Guinea. Lomandra multiflora has two subspecies: Lomandra multiflora subspecies multiflora and Lomandra multiflora subspecies dura. Subspecies multiflora can be found naturally in Southern Papua New Guinea, Western Melbourne, and the North Eastern tip of Northern Territory. Subspecies dura can only be found in Southern Australia, specifically in the Southern Flinders, Mt. Lofty Ranges, Yorke and Fleurieu Peninsulas.

Lomandra multiflora grows chiefly in woodland and open forest on a variety of soils, widespread in mainly the drier areas of the regions. The mat-rush grows on the substrates: clay soils on shale, basalt, metamorphics and occasionally on sandstone, low to medium nutrients and well drained.

== Ecology ==
Lomandra multiflora’s optimal conditions for cultivation includes well drained soils grown in a range of climates, full sun, or semi-shade. The mat-rush is a fire-retardant plant as well as facultative and obligate resprouters, meaning it relies on resprouting to regenerate after fire.

Propagation of Lomandra multiflora can be easily done through the seed or also by division of clumps. Seeds take around 8–10 weeks to germinate without pre-treatment.

The seed dispersal of Lomandra multiflora can be done through ant adapted elaisome.

The seed of the plant is a source of food for seed-eating birds, skinks, and lizards.

Lomandra multiflora is a food for native Australian butterflies, including Trapezites eliena and Trapezites petalia, caterpillars, and moths. Lomandra multiflora subspecies dura is a caterpillar food plant; the seeds are also a food source for lizards. The plant attracts native bees.

The mat-rush is suspected of poisoning sheep.

== Uses ==
Historically, Indigenous people used the long leaves of Lomandra multiflora for basket making and other forms of weaving, as well as the plant’s nectar as a food.

Lomandra multiflora is a fire-retardant plant, meaning it does not catch on fire easily and resprouts from the base if burnt. It can also be used for stabilising banks. The plant can be useful and ideal as a foreground plant in a bush garden, cottage gardens and rockeries as it can withstand a range of different conditions, from frost to drought and brief swampy periods.

=== Propagation and cultivation ===
Lomandra multiflora are easily propagated through stem tip cuttings. The fruit of the plant is a capsule that turns golden brown when ripe. The ripeness of the seed can be determined when it becomes firm and hard. To collect the seeds, cut the stem and place in a large paper bag in a warm place. The capsule or fruit, will open and release the seed. Alternatively, Lomandra multiflora can also be propagated by dividing existing clumps, known as root ball division.
