= Lomandra patens =

Scientific classification
- Kingdom: Plantae
- Clade: Tracheophytes
- Clade: Angiosperms
- Clade: Monocots
- Order: Asparagales
- Family: Asparagaceae
- Subfamily: Lomandroideae
- Genus: Lomandra
- Species: L. patens

Binomial name
- Lomandra patens A.T.Lee

Species of flowering plant

Lomandra patens is a perennial, rhizomatous herb found in Australia.
