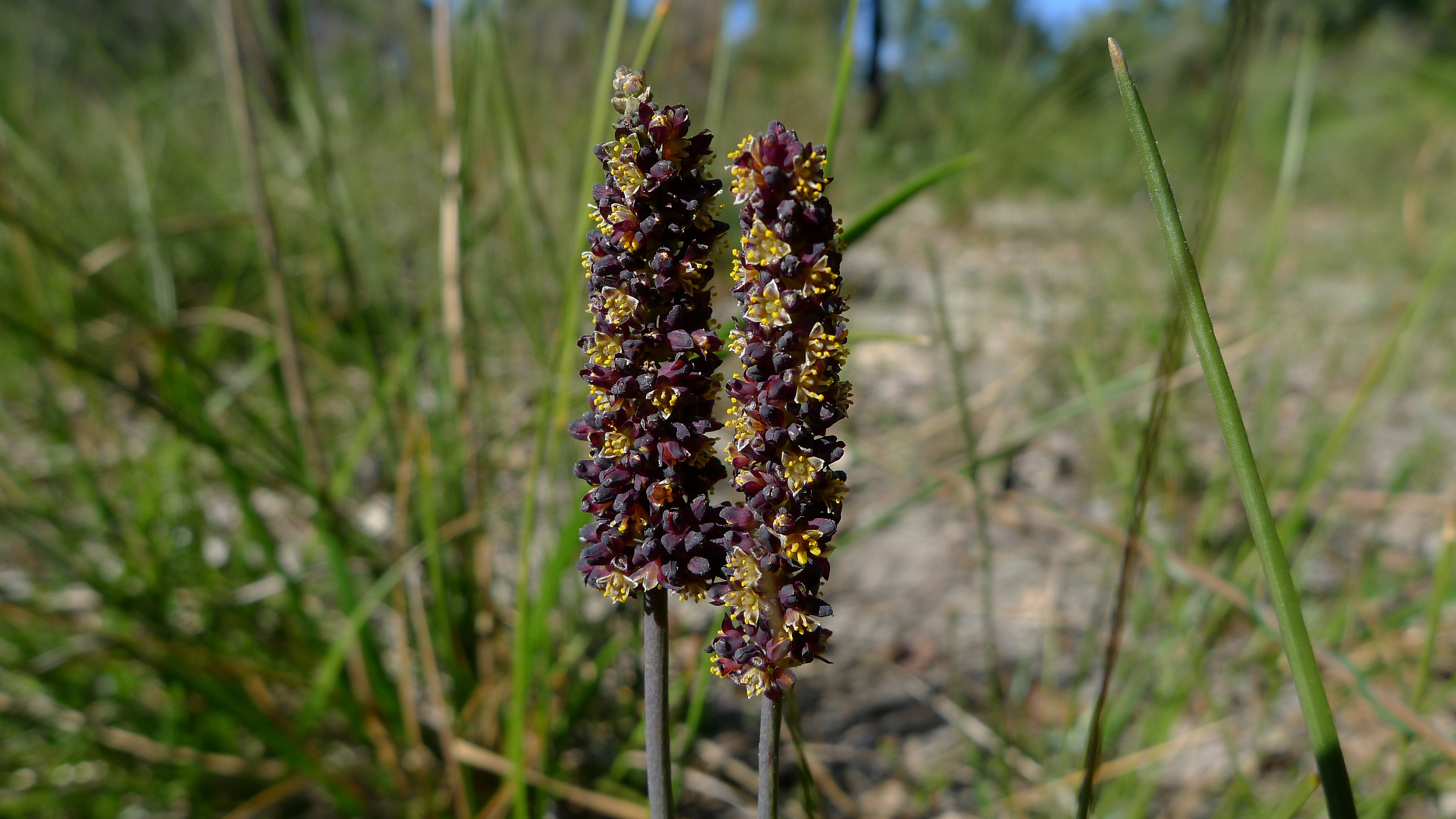

Scientific classification
- Kingdom: Plantae
- Clade: Tracheophytes
- Clade: Angiosperms
- Clade: Monocots
- Order: Asparagales
- Family: Asparagaceae
- Subfamily: Lomandroideae
- Genus: Lomandra
- Species: L. preissii

Binomial name
- Lomandra preissii (Endl.) Ewart

= Lomandra preissii =

Species of flowering plant

Lomandra preissii is a species of perennial, herbaceous plant in the family Asparagaceae native to Southwest Australia. It grows to a heights of 20 cm (7.9 in) to 60 cm (24 in), and has flowers in green or yellow/purple from April till July.

== Gallery ==
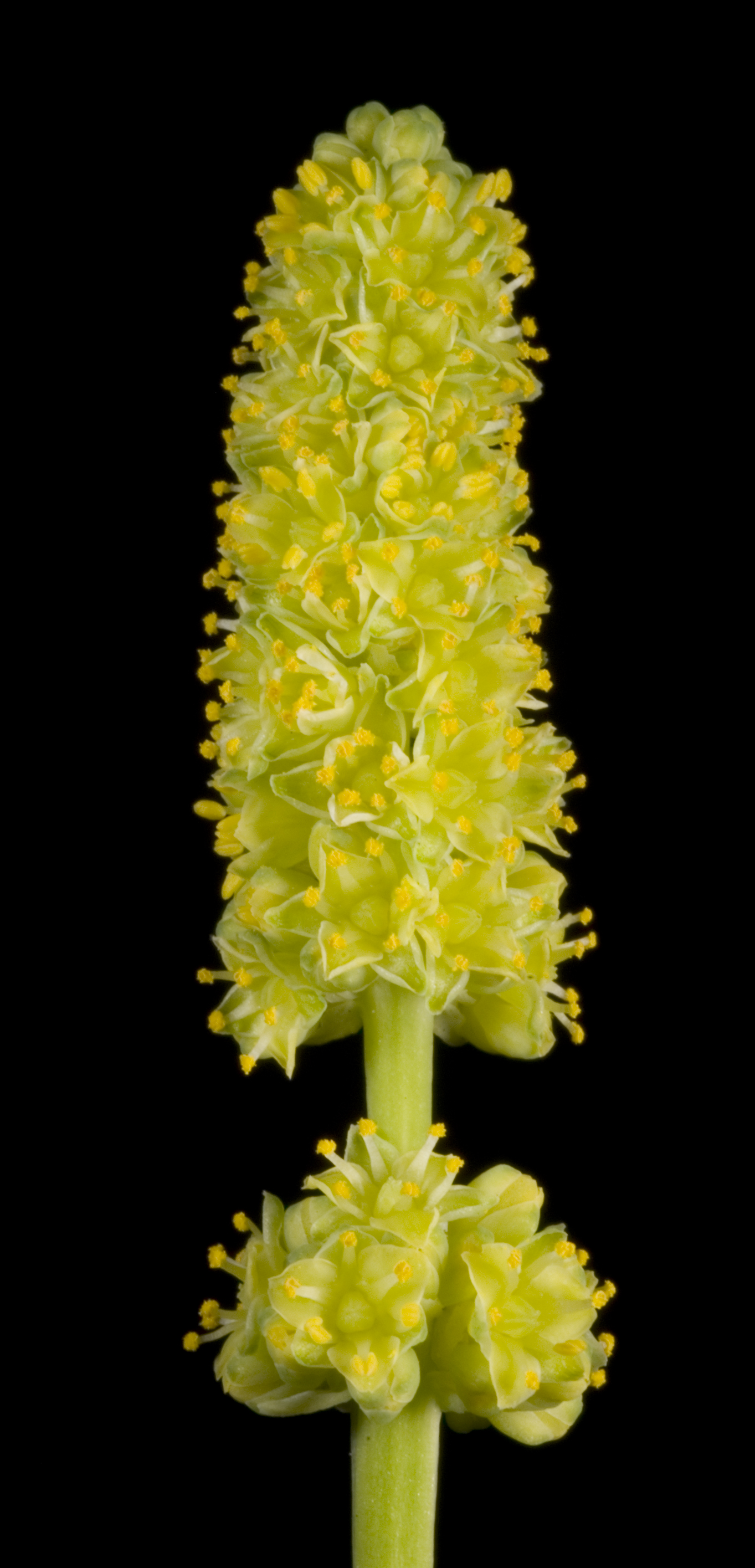

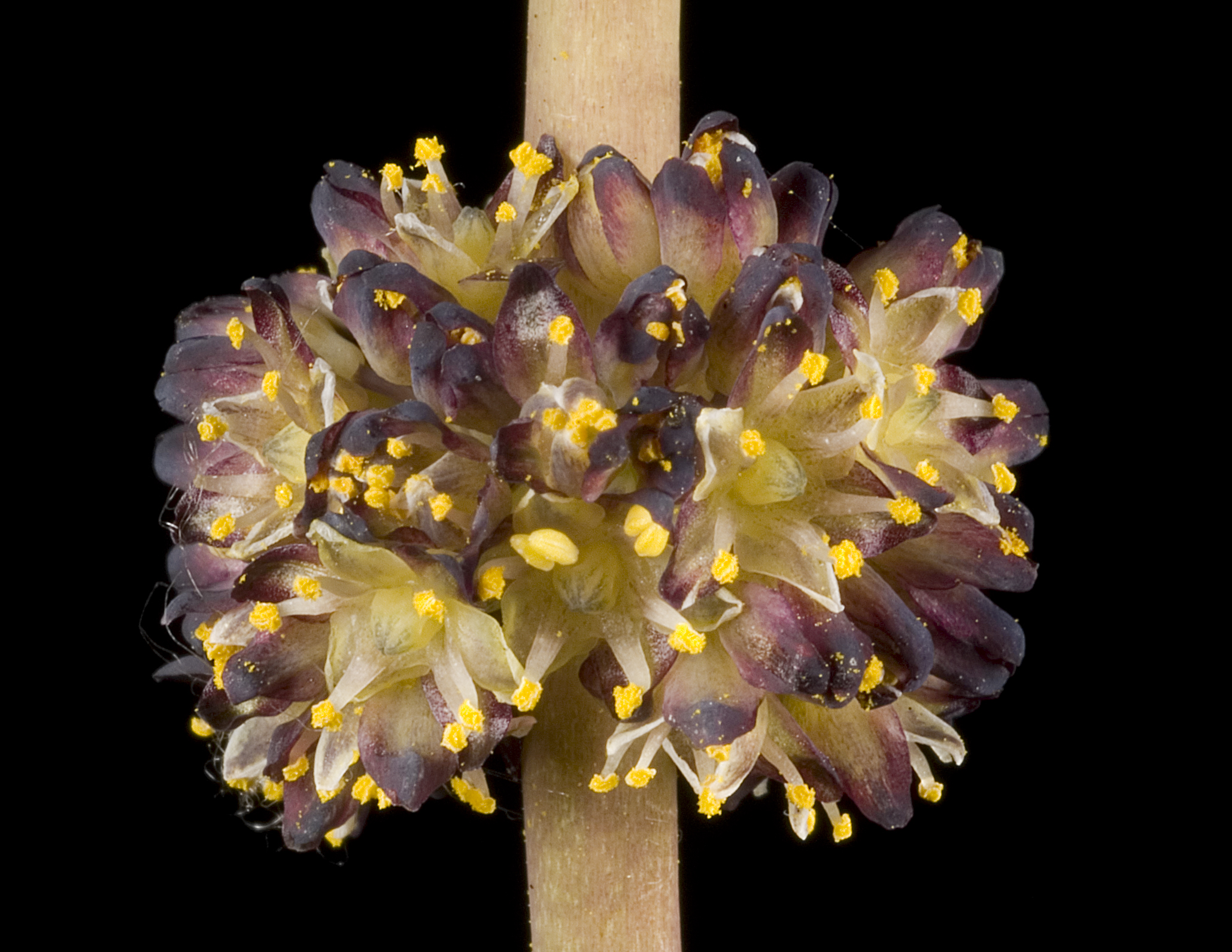

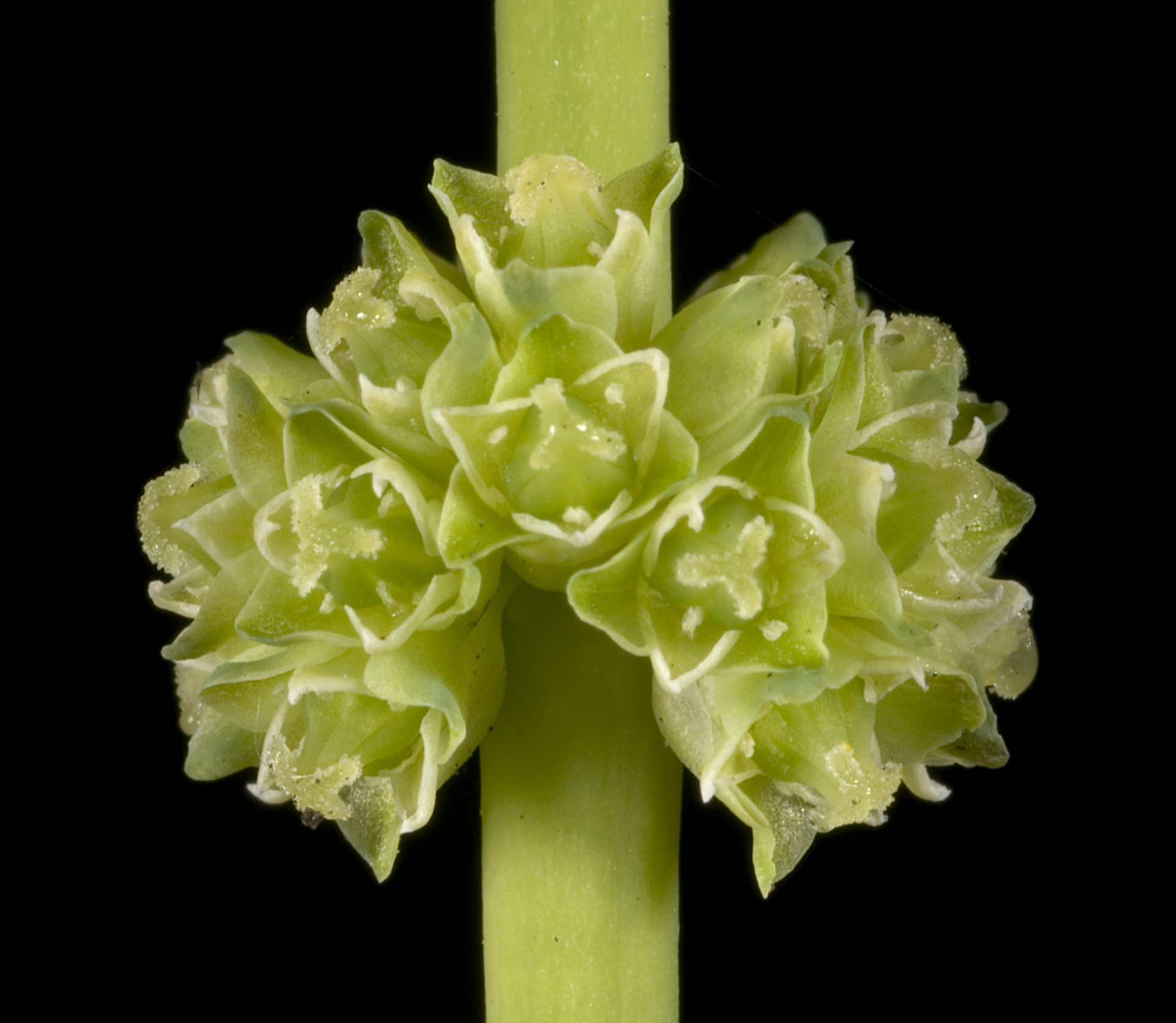
