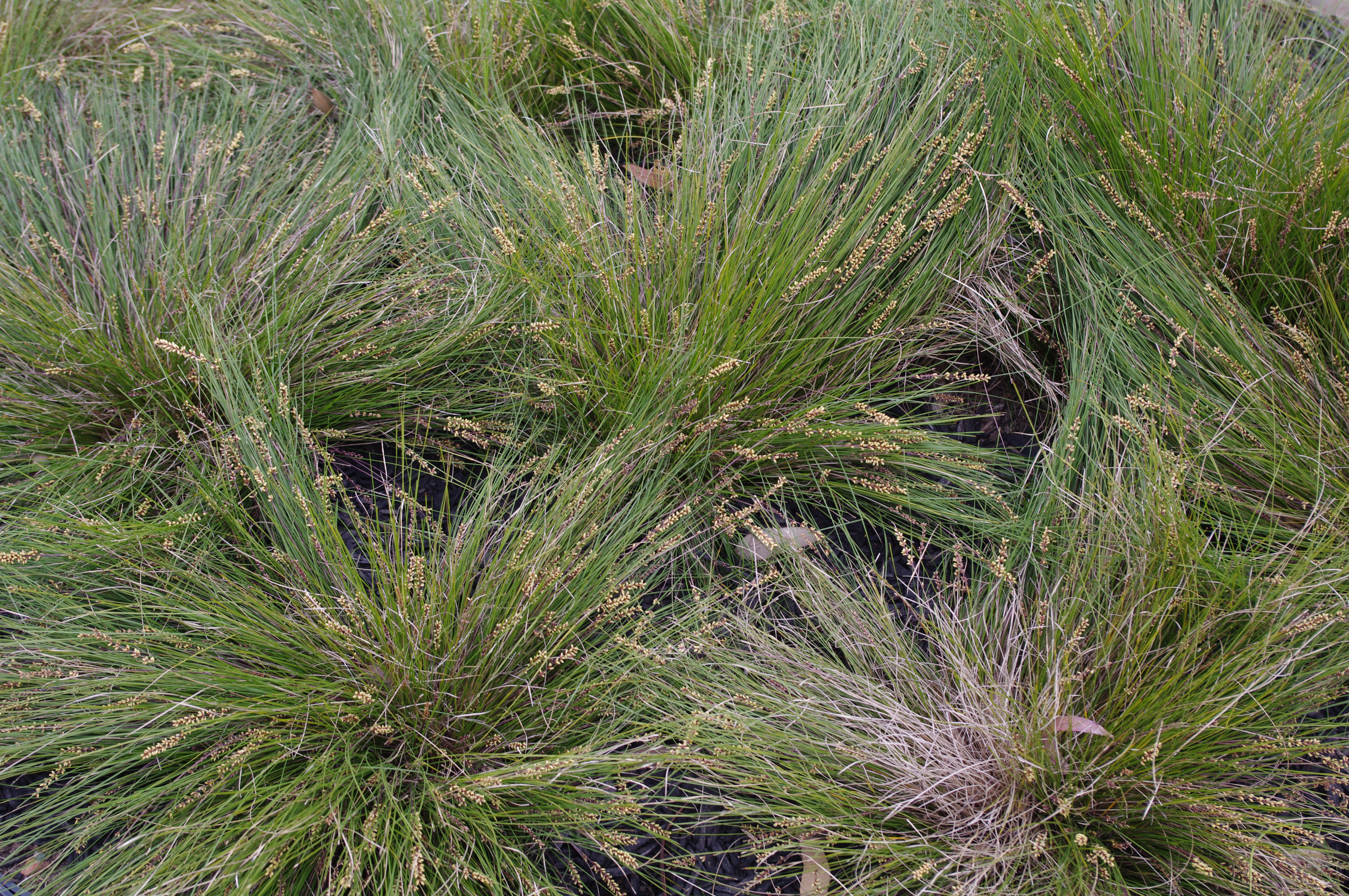
- Lomandra confertifolia in the Cranbourne Botanic Gardens

Scientific classification
- Kingdom: Plantae
- Clade: Tracheophytes
- Clade: Angiosperms
- Clade: Monocots
- Order: Asparagales
- Family: Asparagaceae
- Subfamily: Lomandroideae
- Genus: Lomandra
- Species: L. confertifolia

Binomial name
- Lomandra confertifolia (F.M.Bailey) Fahn

Synonyms
- Xerotes confertifolia F.M.Bailey

= Lomandra confertifolia =

Species of flowering plant

Lomandra confertifolia is a species of perennial herbs in the genus Lomandra, Asparagaceae, subfamily Lomandroideae. It is native to Queensland, Australia. Although it appears grass-like, it is not in the grass family.

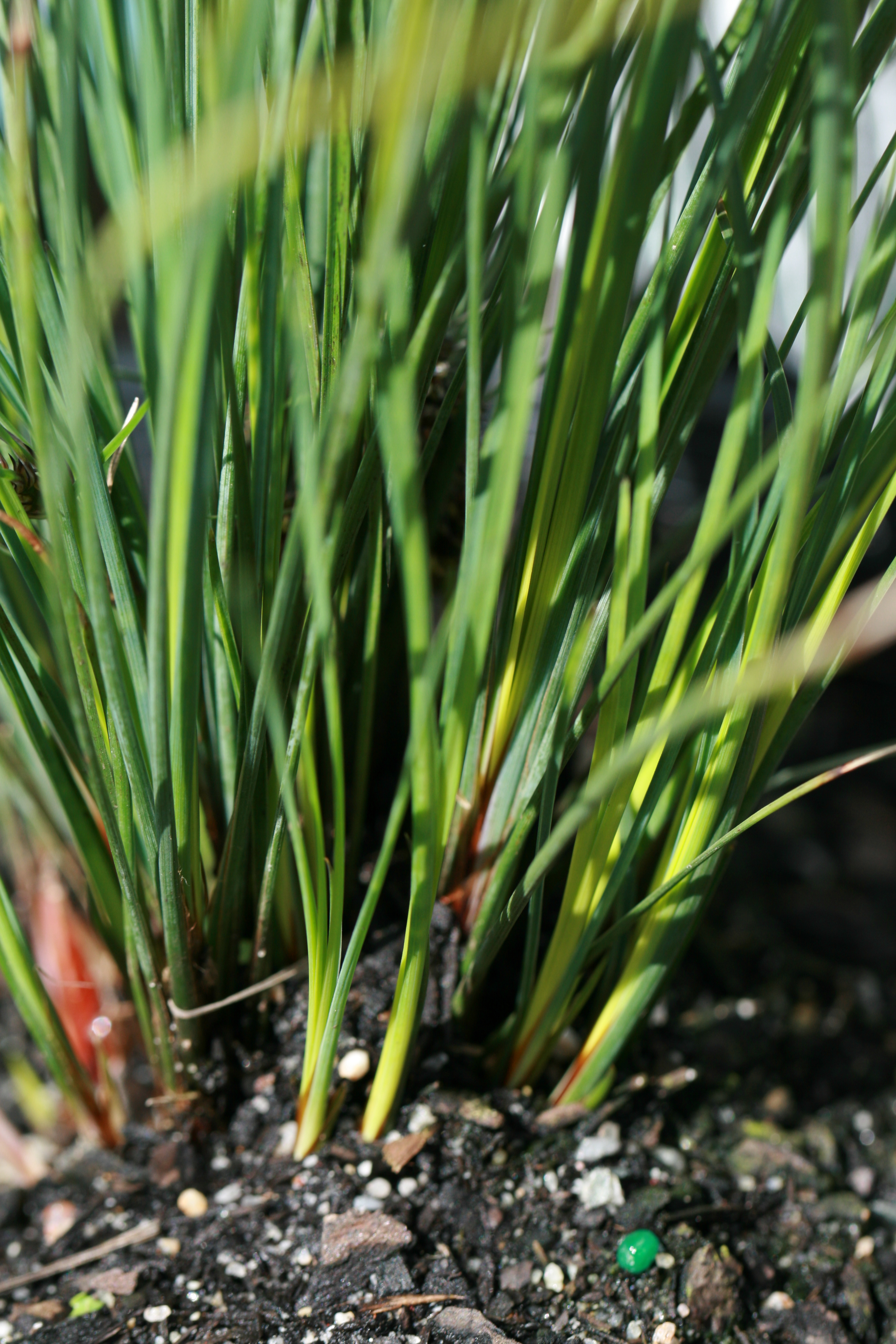
Base

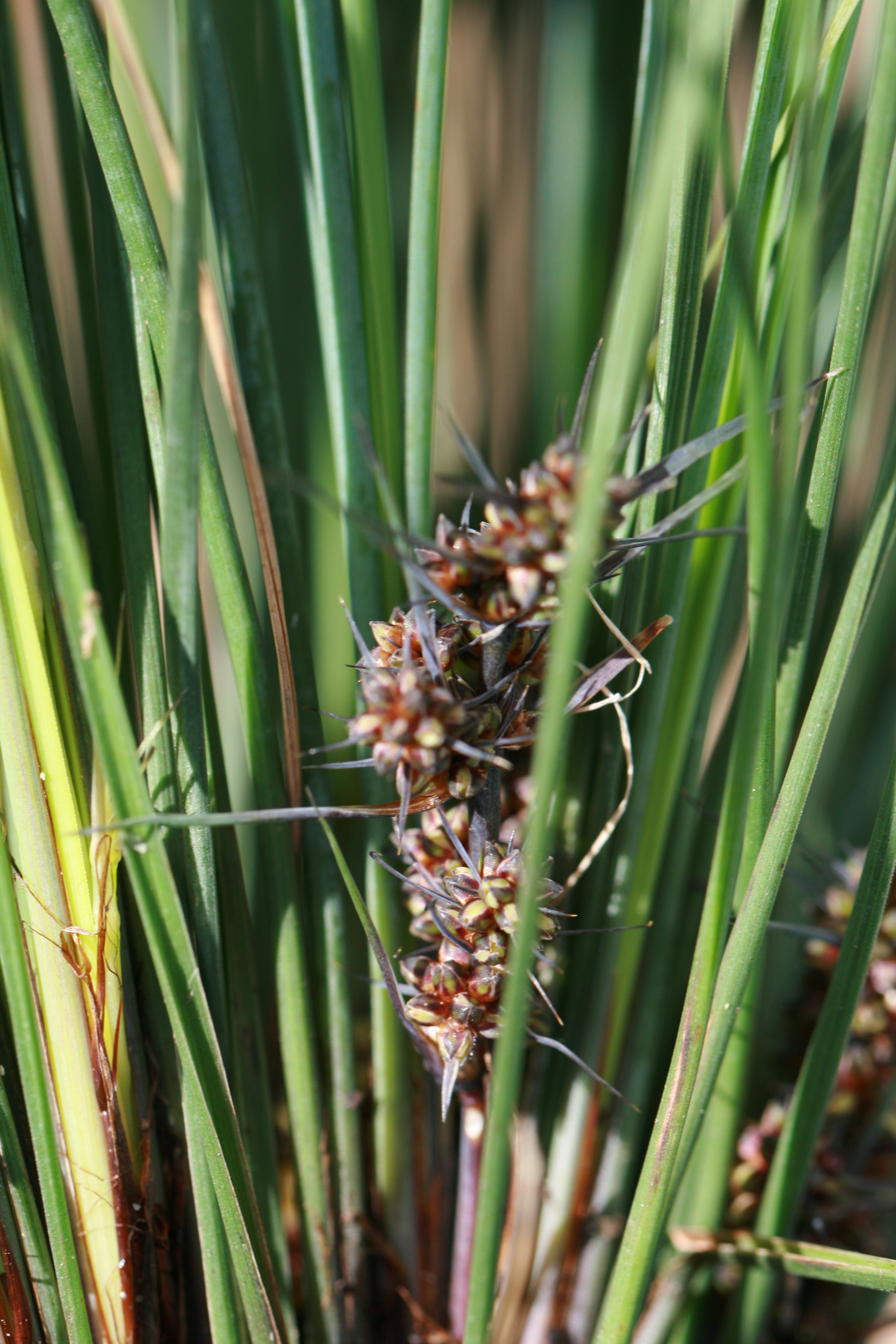
Seeds
