= Lomandra glauca =

Scientific classification
- Kingdom: Plantae
- Clade: Tracheophytes
- Clade: Angiosperms
- Clade: Monocots
- Order: Asparagales
- Family: Asparagaceae
- Subfamily: Lomandroideae
- Genus: Lomandra
- Species: L. glauca

Binomial name
- Lomandra glauca Ewart

Species of plant

Lomandra glauca is a perennial, rhizomatous herb found in Australia.
