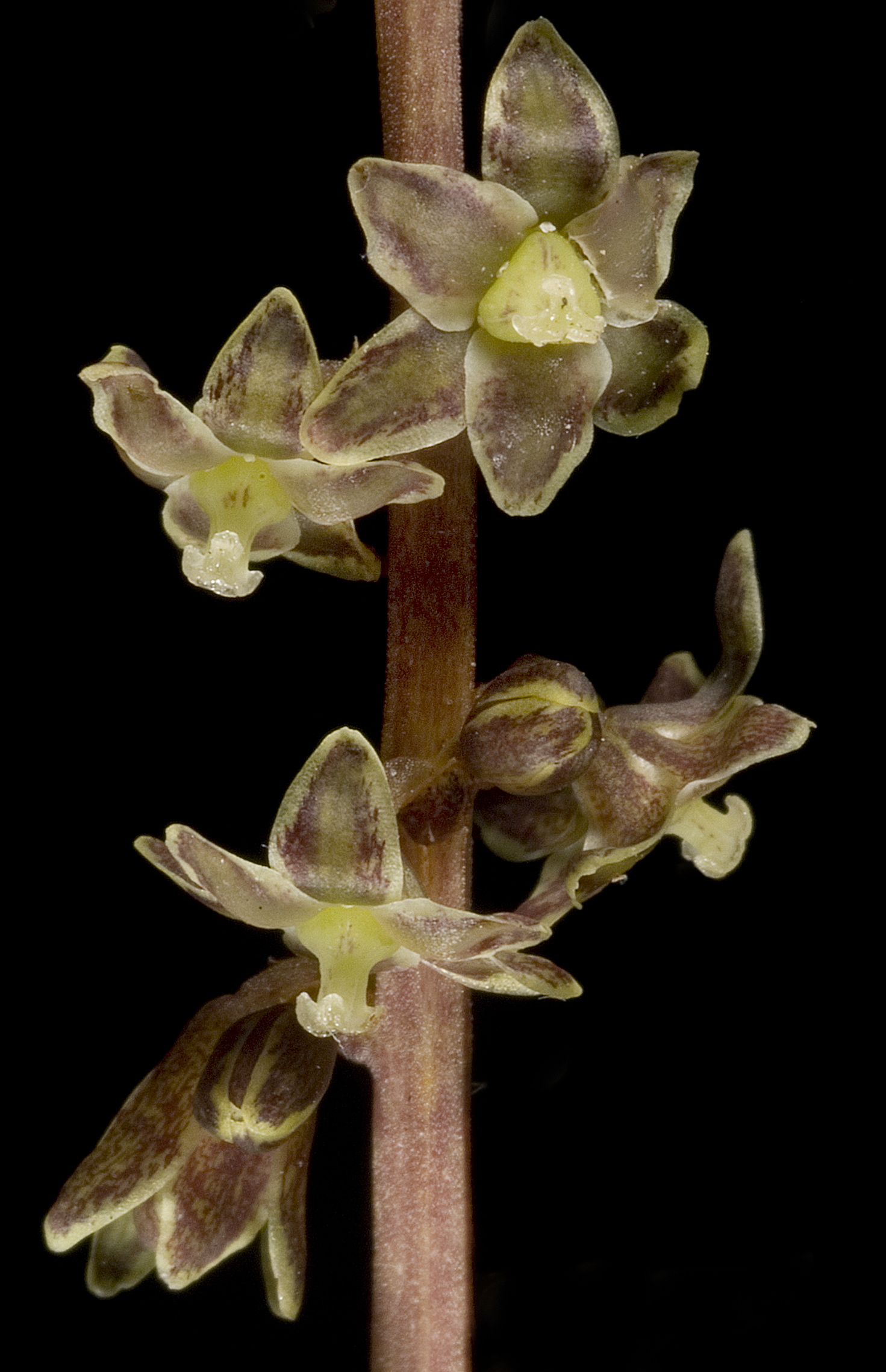

Scientific classification
- Kingdom: Plantae
- Clade: Tracheophytes
- Clade: Angiosperms
- Clade: Monocots
- Order: Asparagales
- Family: Asparagaceae
- Subfamily: Lomandroideae
- Genus: Lomandra
- Species: L. micrantha

Binomial name
- Lomandra micrantha (Endl.) Ewart

= Lomandra micrantha =

Species of Australian flowering plant

Lomandra micrantha commonly known as small-flower mat-rush, is a species of flowering plant in the family Asparagaceae.

== Description ==
Lomandra micrantha is a tufted perennial herb and grows up to 70 cm (27.6 in) in height; its leaves are 20–50 cm long and 0.8–2.5 mm wide.

It flowers from March to November. It is dioecious with green or yellow-orange flowers.

== Taxonomy ==
Lomandra micrantha contains the following subspecies:

- Lomandra micrantha teretifolia
- Lomandra micrantha micrantha
- Lomandra micrantha tuberculata
