= Lomandra beaniana =

Conservation status
- Least Concern (NCA)

Scientific classification
- Kingdom: Plantae
- Clade: Embryophytes
- Clade: Tracheophytes
- Clade: Spermatophytes
- Clade: Angiosperms
- Clade: Monocots
- Order: Asparagales
- Family: Asparagaceae
- Subfamily: Lomandroideae
- Genus: Lomandra
- Species: L. beaniana

Binomial name
- Lomandra beaniana Jian Wang ter

Species of flowering plant

Lomandra beaniana is a species of tree in the family Asparagaceae. It is found in New South Wales and Queensland in Australia.

== Habitat ==
It is native to eastern Australia. It can be found from Byfield, Queensland in the north, to near Molong, New South Wales in the south. It grows in altitudes of up to 700 metres above sea level down to coastal regions. It occurs in sandy and loamy soils in open forest and woodland dominated by Eucalyptus and Corymbia trees.

== Conservation ==
Under the Nature Conservation Act 1992 it is regarded as Least Concern.
