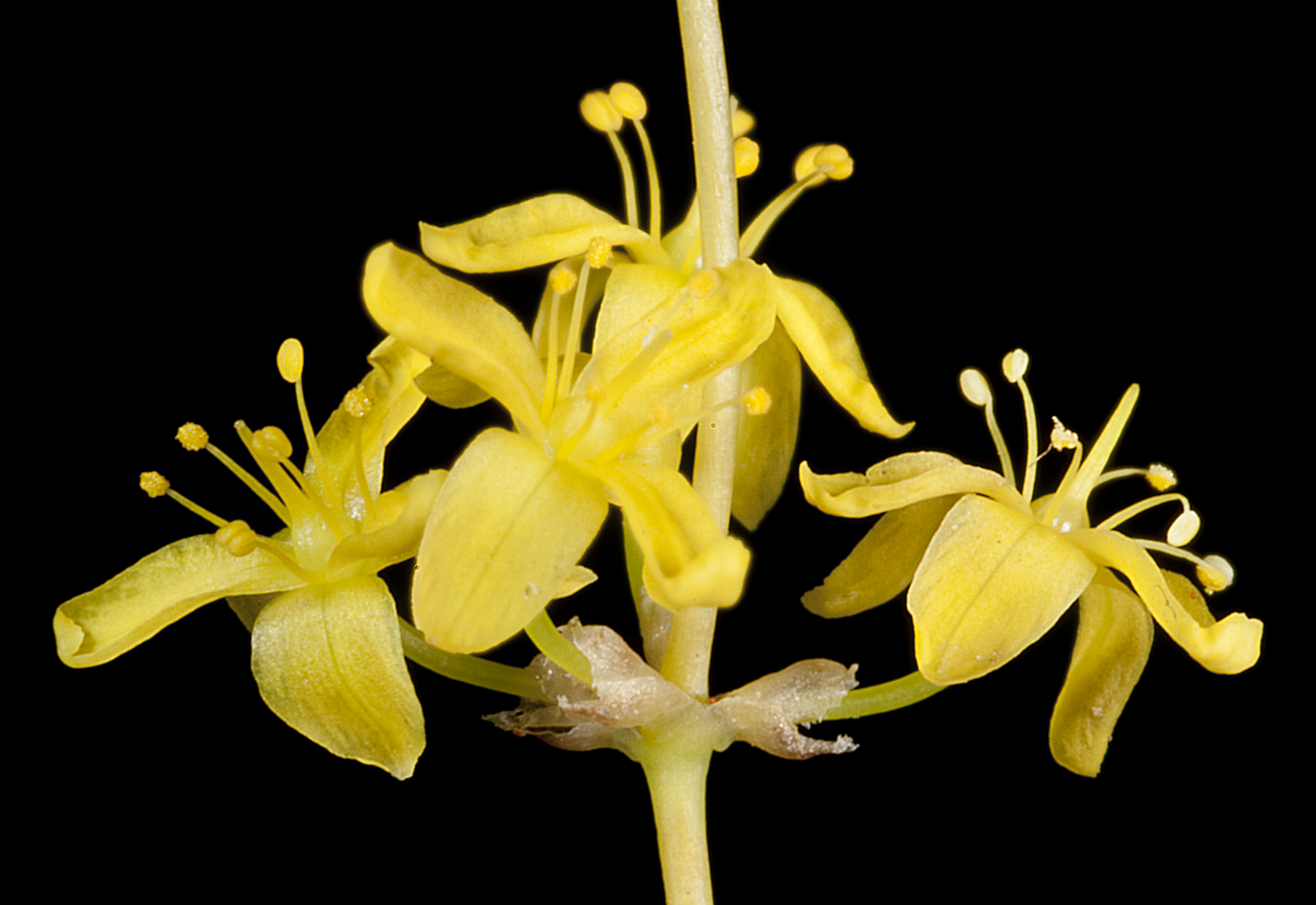
- Chamaexeros fimbriata

Scientific classification
- Kingdom: Plantae
- Clade: Tracheophytes
- Clade: Angiosperms
- Clade: Monocots
- Order: Asparagales
- Family: Asparagaceae
- Subfamily: Lomandroideae
- Genus: Chamaexeros; Benth.

= Chamaexeros =

Genus of flowering plants

Chamaexeros is a genus of tufted perennial herbs in the family Asparagaceae, subfamily Lomandroideae (formerly family Laxmanniaceae).

The genus contains 4 known species, all endemic to Western Australia:

- Chamaexeros fimbriata (F.Muell.) Benth.
- Chamaexeros longicaulis T.D.Macfarl.
- Chamaexeros macranthera Kuchel
- Chamaexeros serra (Endl.) Benth. Little Fringe-leaf
