= Alma Theodora Lee =

Australian botanist

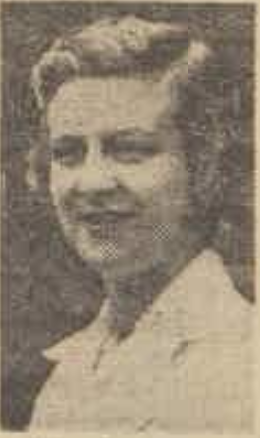
- Born: Alma Theodora Melvaine; 12 April 1912; Tingha, New South Wales, Australia
- Died: 20 October 1990 (aged 78); Wellington, New South Wales, Australia
- Known for: plant taxonomy
- Spouse: David Lee
- Scientific career
- Author abbrev. (botany): A.T.Lee; Melvaine

Alma Theodora Lee (née Melvaine; 12 April 1912 — 20 October 1990) was an Australian botanist and plant taxonomist who worked at the National Herbarium of New South Wales, University of Sydney, and CSIRO. She is notable for raising the standard of systematic botany in Australia, and for her revisions of Swainsona and Typha. She also studied the Fabaceae with colleagues. The standard author abbreviation A.T.Lee is used to indicate this person as the author when citing a botanical name. She described over 40 species. The March 1991 issue of the journal Telopea was dedicated to her memory.

== Personal ==
Born in Tingha, a small town in northern New South Wales, to Walter Melvaine, a gold prospector and dredge operator. Valuing an education, the family moved to Sydney for Alma to attend Ascham School in Edgecliff where she attended from 1920 to 1930.

Lee lived in Sydney’s outer suburb of Hornsby for much of her life with the bushland and plants nearby. In her last years, she lived at Bayview.

She married entomologist, David Lee, in 1941. They separated in 1974 and later divorced. They had two sons, James and Alister. Outside of botany, Lee's interests included carpentry, ceramics and the recorder.

== Career ==
Lee received a Bachelor of Science (botany) majoring in botany and geology from the University of Sydney in 1934. She graduated with a Masters in Science from the University of Sydney in 1936, under the direction of Professor T.G.B Osborn. During this time, Lee broadened her interest and knowledge of plant communities with fellow students on excursions to Bulli, Colong Caves and Barrington Tops.

While a student, Lee joined the National Herbarium of New South Wales, then part of the Royal Botanic Garden, Sydney.

Lee spent a year at the Plant Introduction Section of CSIR (later renamed CSIRO) in Canberra, where she recommended the creation of a herbarium, which was realised by Nancy Tyson Burbidge and later renamed as the Australian National Herbarium.

Lee returned to the National Herbarium of New South Wales in 1938 as staff botanist until 1947 when she left to raise her two sons. In the early 1960s, Lee returned part-time to the Herbarium in Sydney. In 1982, she took on a role as an Honorary Research Associate until 1986.

== Taxa described by Lee ==
- Category:Taxa named by Alma Theodora Lee
