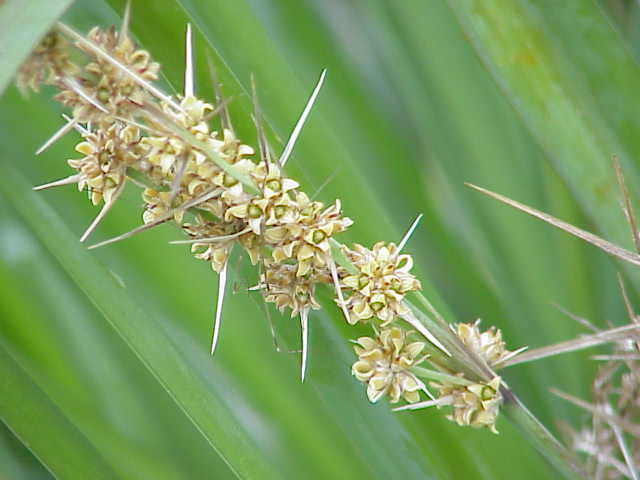
- Lomandra filiformis

Scientific classification
- Kingdom: Plantae
- Clade: Tracheophytes
- Clade: Angiosperms
- Clade: Monocots
- Order: Asparagales
- Family: Asparagaceae
- Subfamily: Lomandroideae; Thorne & Reveal

Genera
- See text

= Lomandroideae =

Subfamily of flowering plants

Lomandroideae is a subfamily of monocot flowering plants in the family Asparagaceae, order Asparagales, according to the APG III system of 2009. The subfamily name is derived from the generic name of the type genus, Lomandra. The group has previously been treated as a separate family Laxmanniaceae. In the Kubitzki system, it is treated as Lomandraceae Lotsy.

The subfamily consists of some 15 genera and about 180 species from Australasia, southeast Asia, the Americas and the Pacific Islands. The best-known genus is Cordyline.

== Genera ==
Genera include:

- Acanthocarpus Lehm.
- Arthropodium R.Br.
- Chamaescilla F.Muell. ex Benth.
- Chamaexeros Benth.
- Cordyline Comm. ex R.Br. (including Cohnia Kunth)
- Dichopogon Kunth (may be included in Arthropodium)
- Eustrephus R.Br.
- Laxmannia R.Br. (including Bartlingia F. Mueller)
- Lomandra Labill. (including Xerotes R. Brown)
- Murchisonia Brittan
- Romnalda P.F.Stevens
- Sowerbaea Sm.
- Thysanotus R.Br.
- Trichopetalum Lindl. (including Bottinaea Colla)
- Xerolirion A.S.George
