= C. heathi =

C. heathi may refer to:

- Camponotus heathi, Mann, 1916, an ant species in the genus Camponotus
- Candalides heathi, a butterfly species in the genus Candalides found in Australia
- Crematogaster heathi, Mann, 1916, an ant species in the genus Crematogaster

== Subspecies ==
- Candalides heathi heathi, Cox, 1873, a subspecies in the butterfly species Candalides heathi

== See also ==
- Heathi (disambiguation)
