= C. gilberti =

C. gilberti may refer to:

- Candalides gilberti, a butterfly species
- Cilus gilberti, a saltwater fish species
- Cirripectes gilberti, a blenny species
- Citharichthys gilberti, a flatfish species
- Conus gilberti, a sea snail species
