= Neeressa sagada =

Scientific classification
- Domain: Eukaryota
- Kingdom: Animalia
- Phylum: Arthropoda
- Class: Insecta
- Order: Lepidoptera
- Superfamily: Noctuoidea
- Family: Erebidae
- Subfamily: Arctiinae
- Genus: Neeressa
- Species: N. sagada

Binomial name
- Neeressa sagada (Semper, 1898)

Synonyms
- Trichaeta sagada Semper, 1898

Species of moth

Neeressa sagada is a moth of the subfamily Arctiinae. It was described by Georg Semper in 1898. It is found on Luzon in the Philippines.
