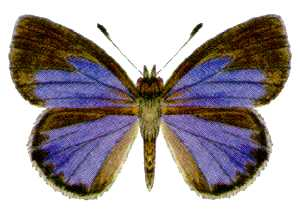

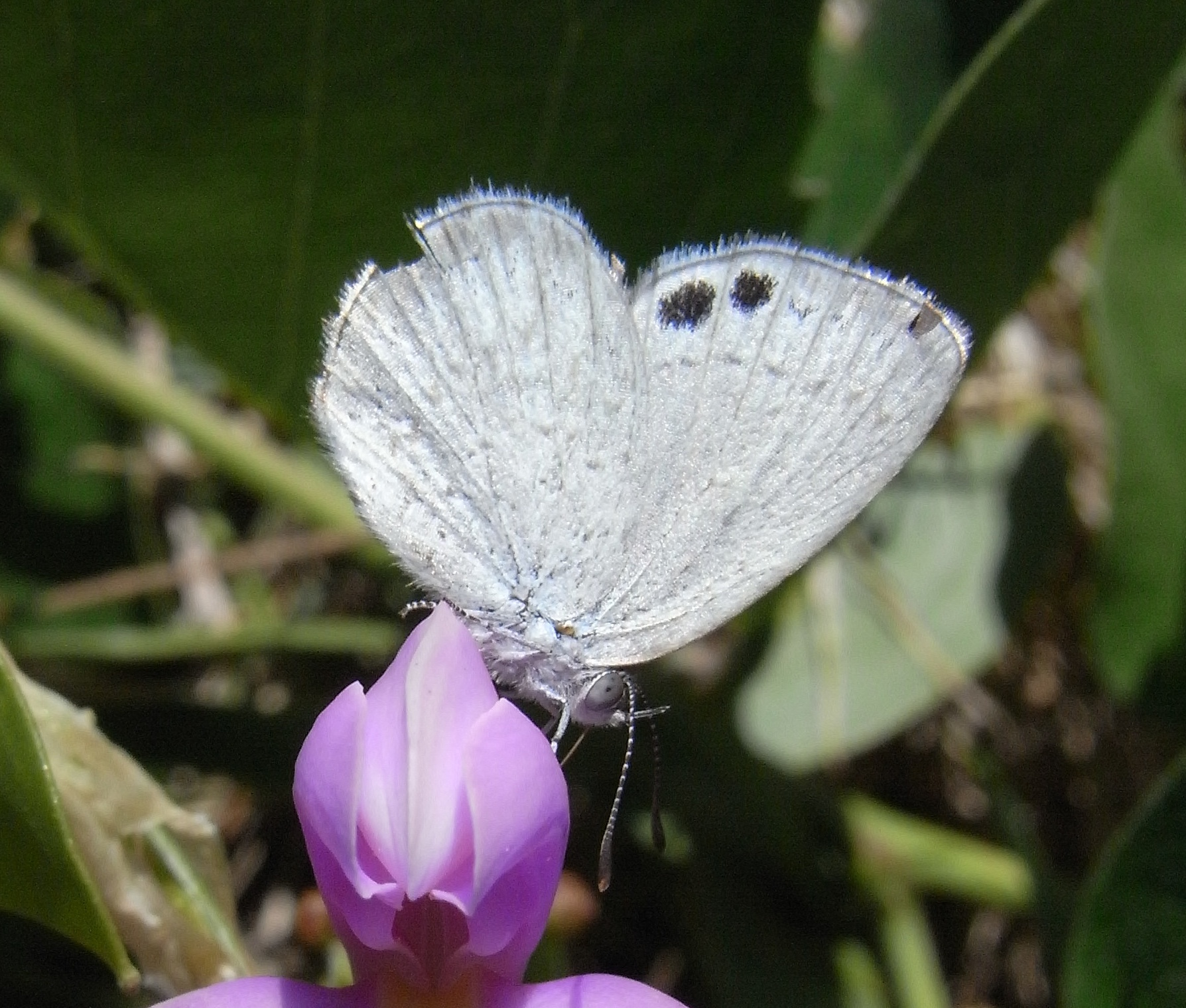

Scientific classification
- Domain: Eukaryota
- Kingdom: Animalia
- Phylum: Arthropoda
- Class: Insecta
- Order: Lepidoptera
- Family: Lycaenidae
- Genus: Candalides
- Species: C. hyacinthina

Binomial name
- Candalides hyacinthina (Semper, [1879])

Synonyms
- Holochila hyacinthina Semper, [1879]; Polycyma cassythae Scott, 1890; Candalides cassythae Couchman, 1962; Cupipo simplexa Tepper, 1882; Polyommatus cyanites Meyrick, 1888

= Candalides hyacinthina =

Varied dusky-blue

Species of butterfly

Candalides hyacinthina, the varied dusky-blue, is a species of butterfly of the family Lycaenidae. It is found along the east coast of Australia, including South Australia, New South Wales, Western Australia and Victoria.

The wingspan is about 40 mm.

== Subspecies ==
- C. h. hyacinthina - common dusky blue (southern Queensland to central Victoria, Grampians)
- C. h. simplexa (Tepper, 1882) - western dusky blue (north-western Victoria, Southern Australia, Western Australia)
- C. h. eugenia Waterhouse & Lyell, 1914 (Queensland (Port Stewart to Yeppoon))
- C. h. josephina Harris, 1952 (Stawell)
