= Macna camiguina =

Scientific classification
- Domain: Eukaryota
- Kingdom: Animalia
- Phylum: Arthropoda
- Class: Insecta
- Order: Lepidoptera
- Family: Pyralidae
- Genus: Macna
- Species: M. camiguina

Binomial name
- Macna camiguina Semper, 1899

Species of moth

Macna camiguina is a species of snout moth in the genus Macna. It was described by Georg Semper in 1899 and is known from the Philippines. It was described from Camiguin de Mindanao, from which its species epithet is derived.
