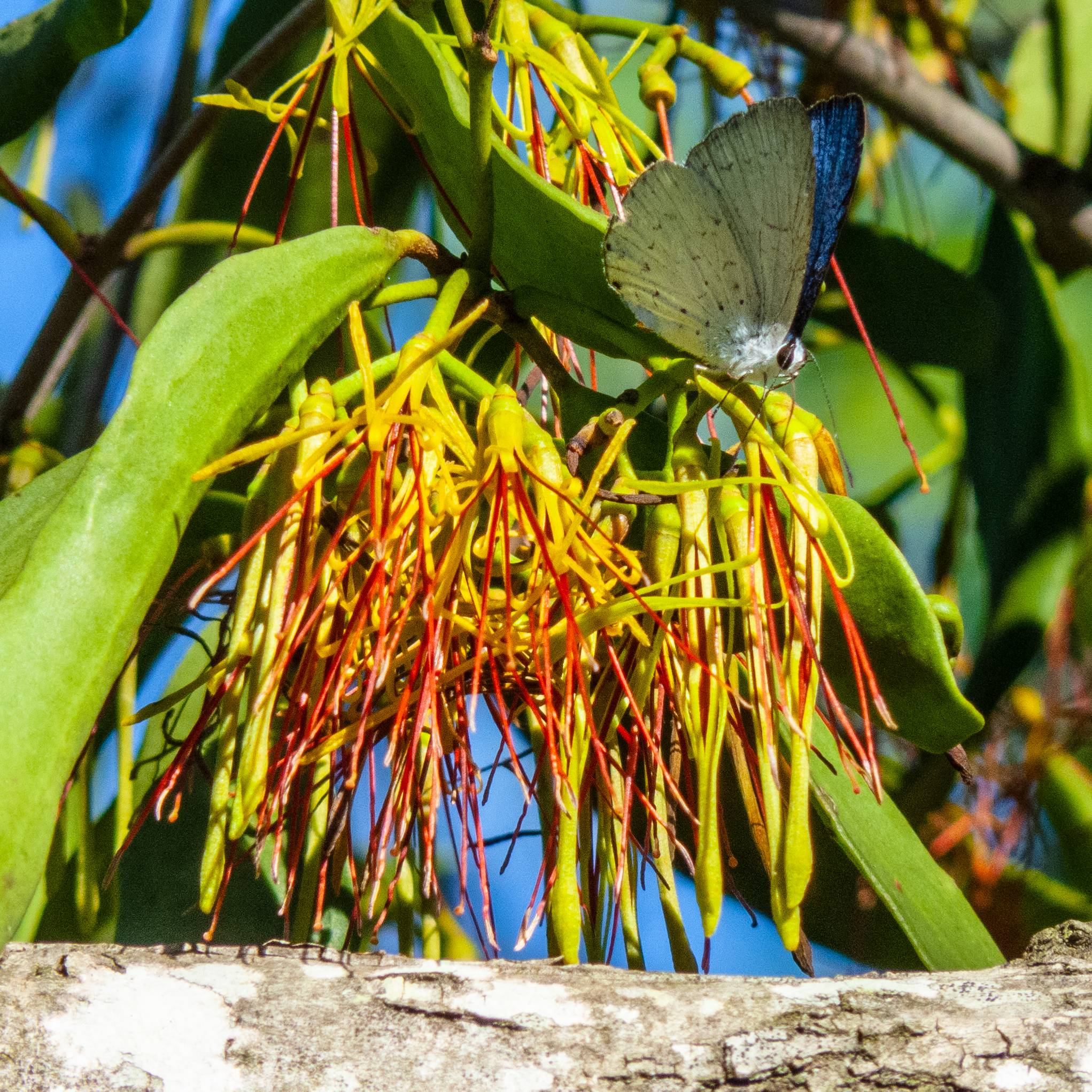

Scientific classification
- Domain: Eukaryota
- Kingdom: Animalia
- Phylum: Arthropoda
- Class: Insecta
- Order: Lepidoptera
- Family: Lycaenidae
- Genus: Candalides
- Species: C. margarita

Binomial name
- Candalides margarita (Semper, [1879])

Synonyms
- Holochila margarita Semper, [1879]; Candalides maria Bethune-Baker, 1908

= Candalides margarita =

Margarita's blue

Species of butterfly

Candalides margarita, or Margarita's blue, is a species of butterfly of the family Lycaenidae. It was described by Georg Semper in 1879. It is found in Australia (along the east coast of Queensland and New South Wales) and New Guinea.

== Subspecies ==
- Candalides margarita margarita (Australia: Cape York to Port Macquarie)
- Candalides margarita maria Bethune-Baker, 1908 (Aru, Misool, Waigeu, West Irian to Papua)
