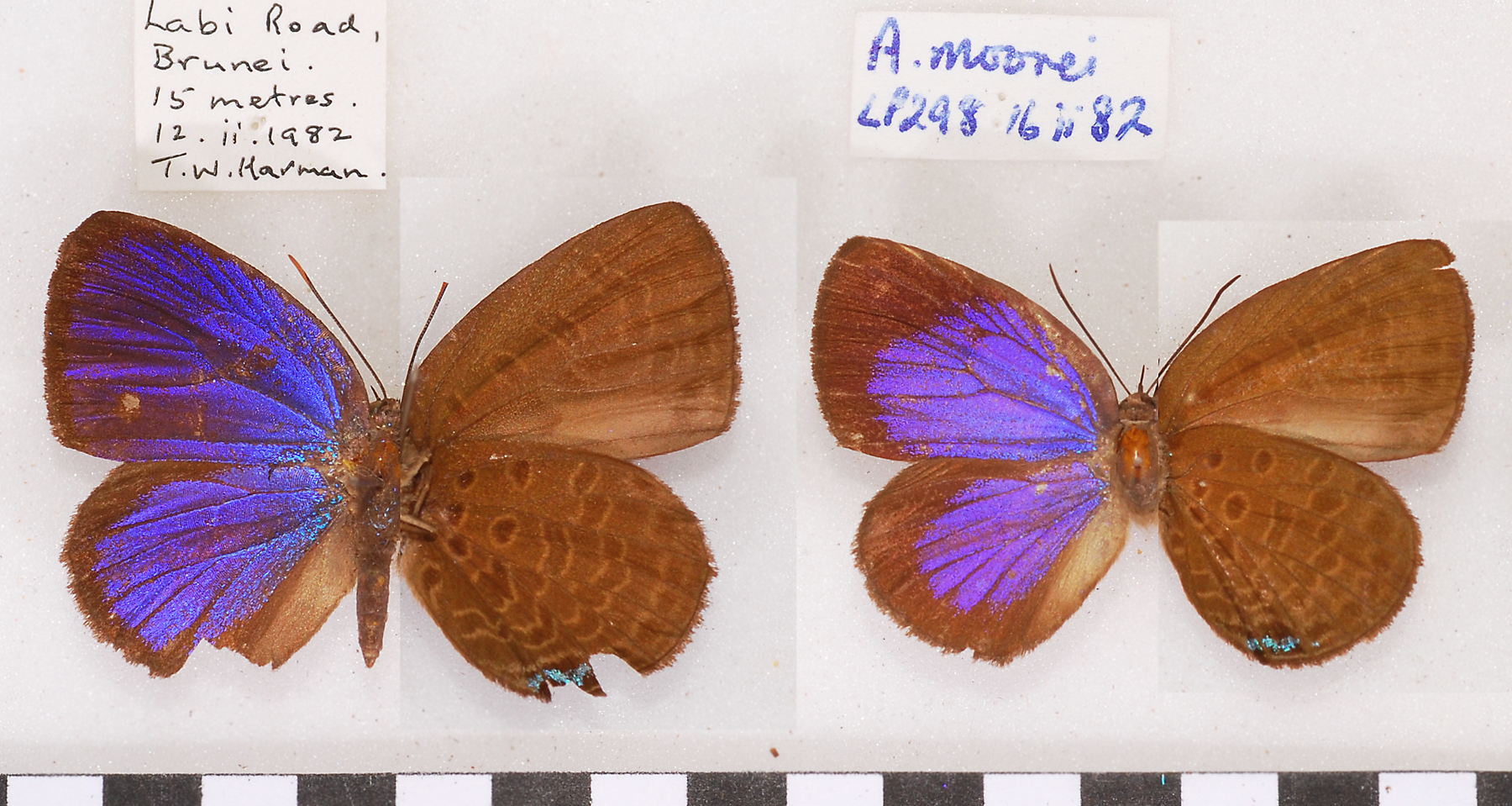

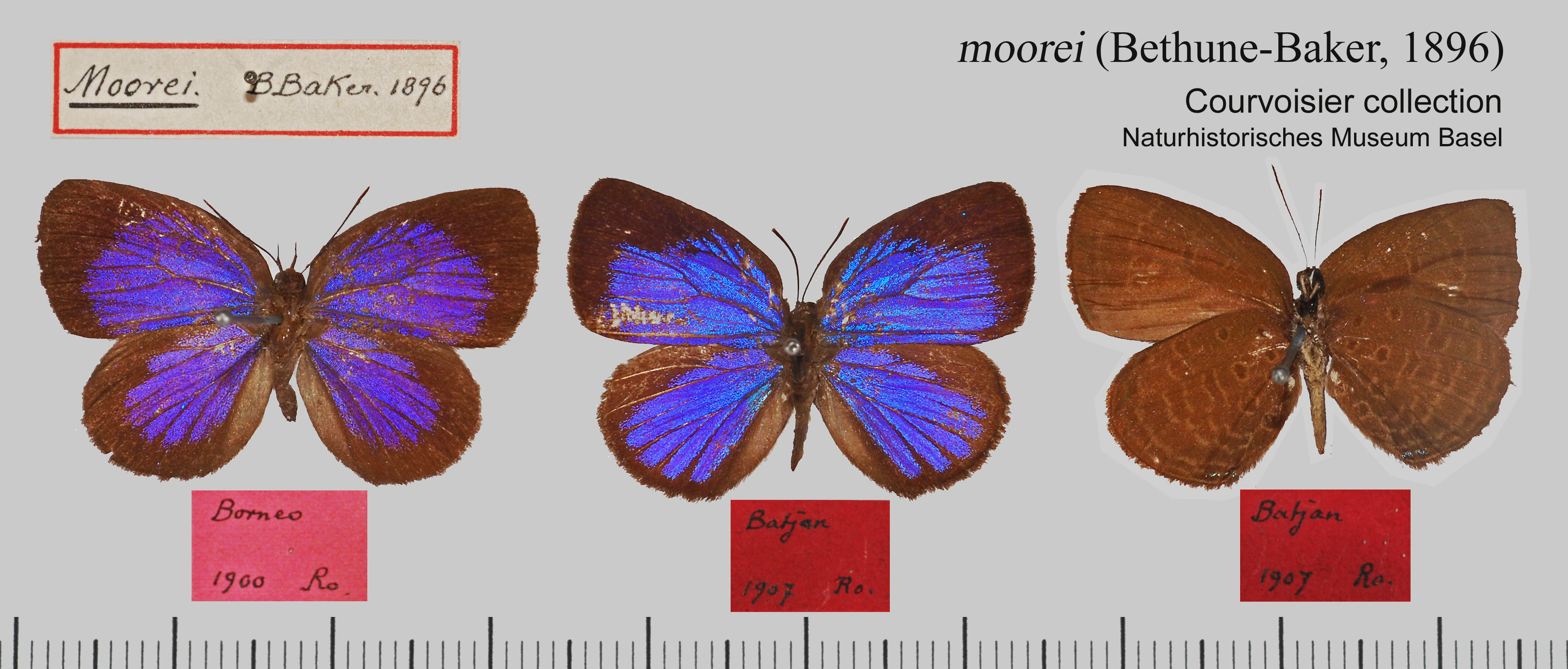
- Arhopala moorei Courvoisier Collection, Basel

Scientific classification
- Kingdom: Animalia
- Phylum: Arthropoda
- Clade: Pancrustacea
- Class: Insecta
- Order: Lepidoptera
- Family: Lycaenidae
- Genus: Arhopala
- Species: A. moorei

Binomial name
- Arhopala moorei Bethune-Baker, 1896

Synonyms
- Arhopala daganda Corbet, 1941; Arhopala busa Corbet, 1941; Arhopala santava Corbet, 1941

= Arhopala moorei =

Species of butterfly

Arhopala moorei is a species of butterfly belonging to the lycaenid family described by George Thomas Bethune-Baker in 1896. It is found in Southeast Asia (Borneo, Thailand, Malay Peninsula, Singapore).

A. moorei differs from davaona in the narrow margin of the wings above and in the anal blue colour and the less regular marking beneath.

== Subspecies ==
- Arhopala moorei moorei (Borneo)
- Arhopala moorei busa Corbet, 1941 (Thailand, Malay Peninsula, Singapore)
