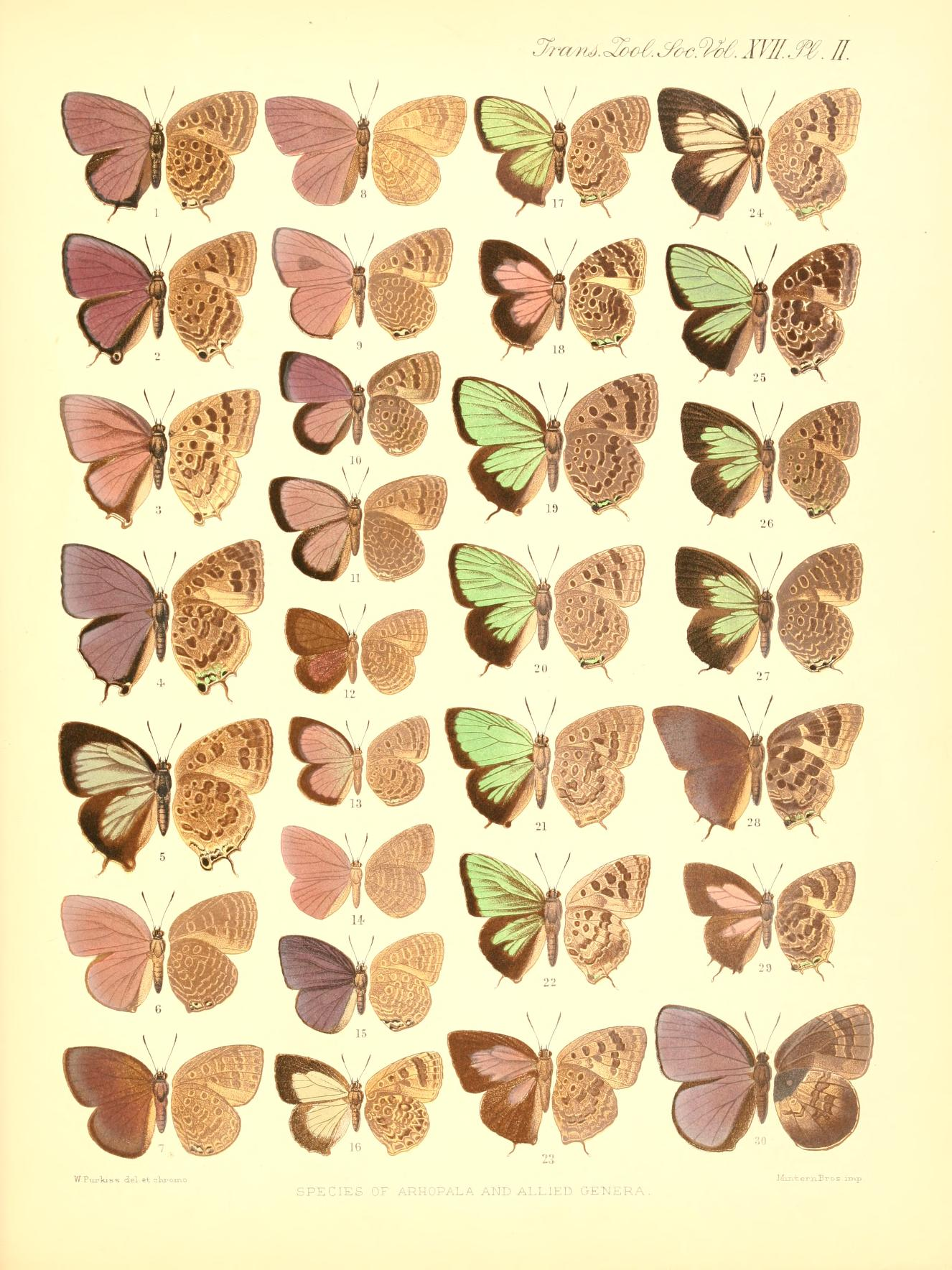
- Arhopala davaona in Bethune Baker (Fig.12 male)

Scientific classification
- Kingdom: Animalia
- Phylum: Arthropoda
- Clade: Pancrustacea
- Class: Insecta
- Order: Lepidoptera
- Family: Lycaenidae
- Genus: Arhopala
- Species: A. davaona

Binomial name
- Arhopala davaona Semper, 1890

= Arhopala davaona =

Species of butterfly

Arhopala davaona is a butterfly in the family Lycaenidae. It was described by Georg Semper in 1890. It is found in the Indomalayan realm where it is endemic to the Philippines.

A. davaona Smpr. is separated from Arhopala hesba by its much smaller size and the more regular marking beneath; besides there is no metallic scaling at all at the anal angle. The upper surface is of a deep dark blue with a very broad marginal band also in the male.
