= Macna minanga =

Scientific classification
- Domain: Eukaryota
- Kingdom: Animalia
- Phylum: Arthropoda
- Class: Insecta
- Order: Lepidoptera
- Family: Pyralidae
- Genus: Macna
- Species: M. minanga

Binomial name
- Macna minanga Semper, 1899

Species of moth

Macna minanga is a species of snout moth in the genus Macna. It was described by Georg Semper in 1899 and is known from Luzon in the Philippines.
