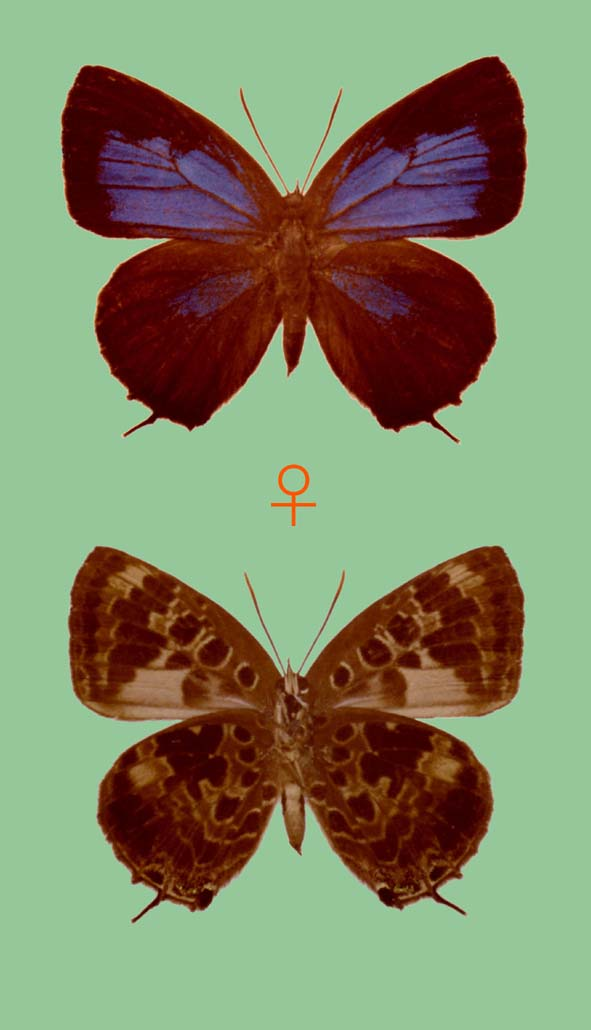
- Female Arhopala staudingeri negrosiana

Scientific classification
- Kingdom: Animalia
- Phylum: Arthropoda
- Clade: Pancrustacea
- Class: Insecta
- Order: Lepidoptera
- Family: Lycaenidae
- Genus: Arhopala
- Species: A. staudingeri

Binomial name
- Arhopala staudingeri Semper, 1890

= Arhopala staudingeri =

Species of butterfly

Arhopala staudingeri is a species of butterfly in the family Lycaenidae. It was described by Georg Semper in 1890. It is found in the Indomalayan realm, where it is endemic to the Philippines.

The forewing length is about 21 mm. Both sexes are very similar, above blackish-brown, the suffused with a deep dark blue reflection, the whole anal third of the hindwing purely bone-coloured, with 3 slightly contiguous transverse spots. Under surface ochreous-yellow, towards the hind-margin paler, before the marginal area a dark transverse line, in the hindwing an angular one; anal area as above. The nominotypical subspecies is distributed on Bohol, Leyte, Panaon, Mindanao and Samar islands. The subspecies A. s. castagnedai is on Luzon and Marinduque islands. The subspecies A. s. negrosiana is found on Negros Island.

== Subspecies ==
- A. s. staudingeri – Philippines (Mindanao)
- A. s. negrosiana (Hayashi, 1981) – Philippines (Negros)
- A. s. castagnedai Osada & Hashimoto, 1987

== Etymology ==
The specific name honours Otto Staudinger.
