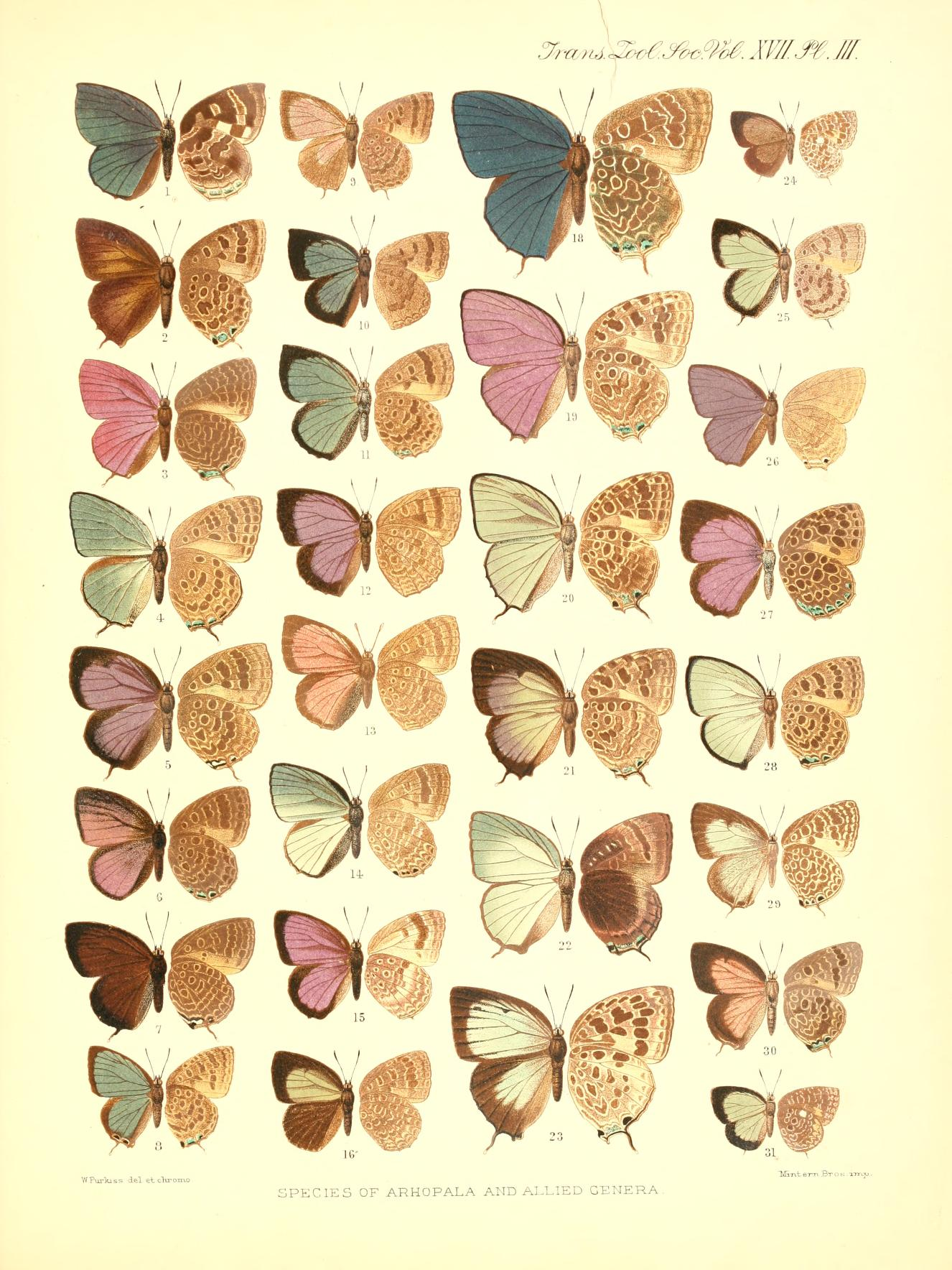
- Arhopala anamuta in Bethune Baker (figure 6 male)

Scientific classification
- Kingdom: Animalia
- Phylum: Arthropoda
- Clade: Pancrustacea
- Class: Insecta
- Order: Lepidoptera
- Family: Lycaenidae
- Genus: Arhopala
- Species: A. anamuta

Binomial name
- Arhopala anamuta Semper, 1890

= Arhopala anamuta =

Species of butterfly

Arhopala anamuta is a butterfly in the family Lycaenidae. It was described by Georg Semper in 1890. It is found in the Indomalayan realm where it is endemic to the Philippines.

== Description ==
Only the male known [1927], having been taken near Davao in Mindanao; distinguished by the whole brown upper surface showing a violet reflection only when seen in a certain direction.The bands beneath are distinctly composed of oval spots. From allata. which it entirely resembles beneath, it is separated by quite tailless wings.
