= Streptophlebia antipolo =

Scientific classification
- Domain: Eukaryota
- Kingdom: Animalia
- Phylum: Arthropoda
- Class: Insecta
- Order: Lepidoptera
- Superfamily: Noctuoidea
- Family: Erebidae
- Subfamily: Arctiinae
- Genus: Streptophlebia
- Species: S. antipolo

Binomial name
- Streptophlebia antipolo (Semper, 1898)

Synonyms
- Syntomoides antipolo Semper, 1898

Species of moth

Streptophlebia antipolo is a moth in the family Erebidae. It was described by Georg Semper in 1898. It is found in the Philippines.
