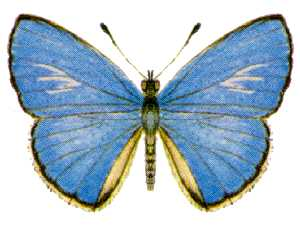

Scientific classification
- Domain: Eukaryota
- Kingdom: Animalia
- Phylum: Arthropoda
- Class: Insecta
- Order: Lepidoptera
- Family: Lycaenidae
- Genus: Candalides
- Species: C. helenita

Binomial name
- Candalides helenita (Semper, [1879])

Synonyms
- Holochila helenita Semper, [1879]; Holochila androdus Miskin, 1890; Holochila subargentea Grose-Smith & Kirby, 1896; Plebeius dimorphus Röber, 1886

= Candalides helenita =

Shining pencil-blue

Species of butterfly

Candalides helenita, the shining pencil-blue, is a species of butterfly of the family Lycaenidae. It is found in Australia and Indonesia.

The wingspan is about 30 mm.

== Subspecies ==
- Candalides helenita helenita (Cape York to Cairns)
- Candalides helenita dimorpha (Röber, 1886) (Waigeu, Misool, Jobi, West Irian to Papua)
