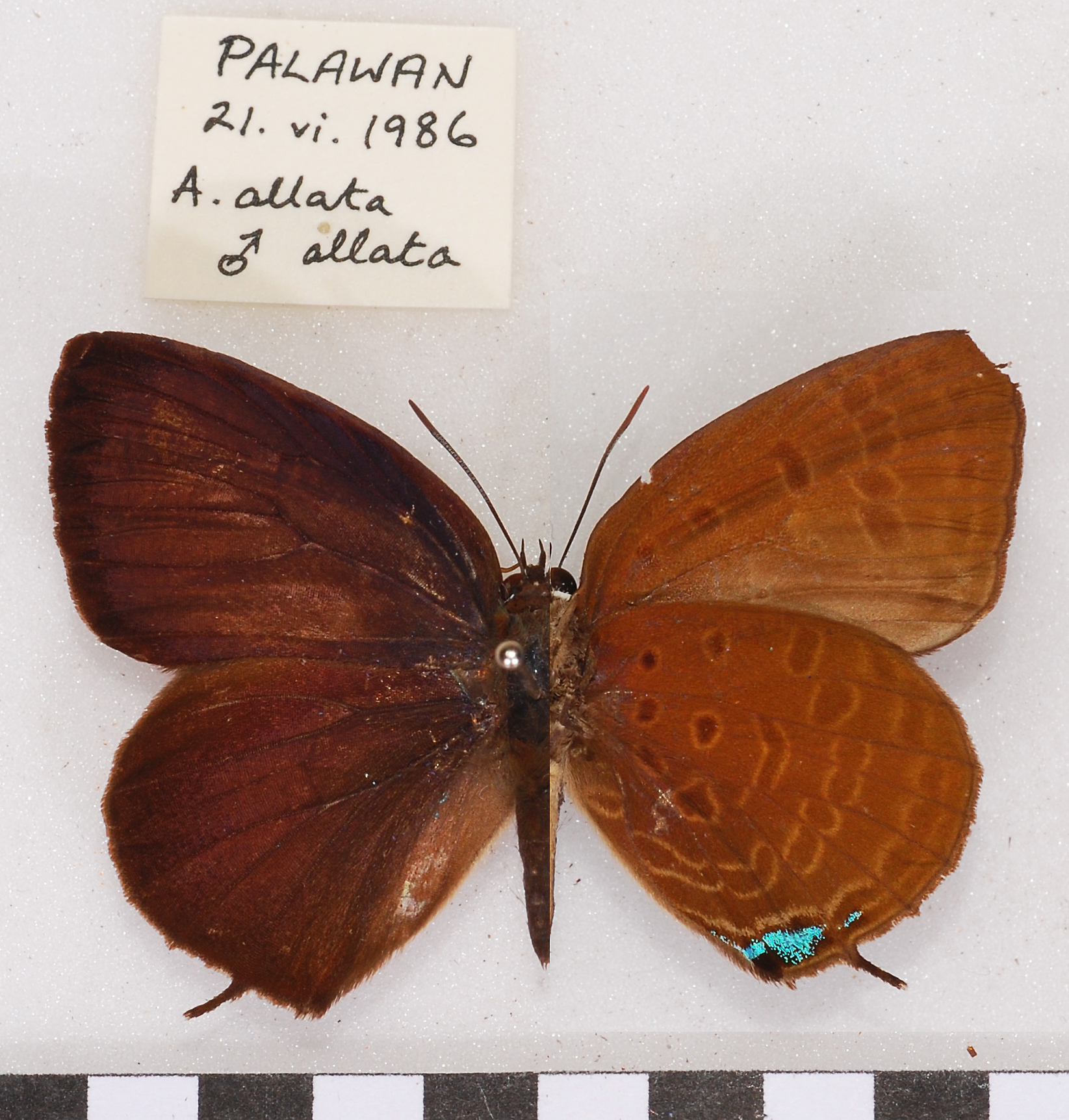
- Upperside on left, underside right

Scientific classification
- Kingdom: Animalia
- Phylum: Arthropoda
- Clade: Pancrustacea
- Class: Insecta
- Order: Lepidoptera
- Family: Lycaenidae
- Genus: Arhopala
- Species: A. allata
- Subspecies: A. a. suffusa

Trinomial name
- Arhopala allata suffusa (Tytler, 1915)

Synonyms
- Amblypodia suffusa Tytler, 1915

= Arhopala allata suffusa =

Tytler's rosy oakblue

Subspecies of butterfly

Arhopala allata suffusa, the Tytler's rosy oakblue, sometimes placed in Amblypodia, is a small subspecies of butterfly found in India that belongs to the lycaenids or blues family.

== Range ==
The butterfly occurs in India from Manipur across onto southern Shan states, Dawnas and Ataran. The species has also been spotted in Bangladesh.

== Status ==
This subspecies is rare.

== See also ==
- Lycaenidae
- List of butterflies of India (Lycaenidae)
