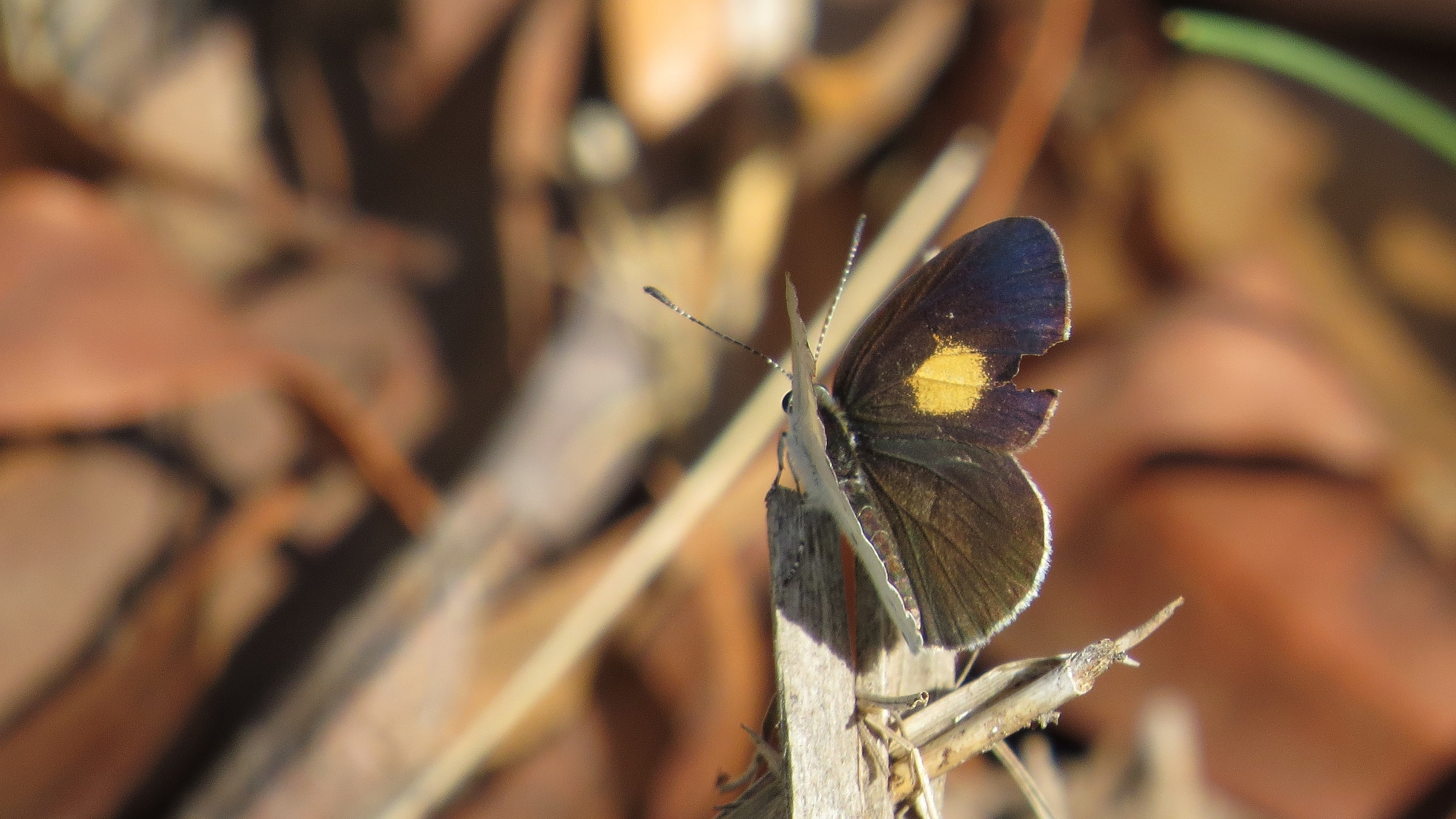

Scientific classification
- Kingdom: Animalia
- Phylum: Arthropoda
- Clade: Pancrustacea
- Class: Insecta
- Order: Lepidoptera
- Family: Lycaenidae
- Genus: Candalides
- Species: C. xanthospilos

Binomial name
- Candalides xanthospilos (Hübner, [1817])

Synonyms
- Rusticus xanthospilos Hübner, [1817]; Polyommatus hubnerii Godart, [1824]; Erina pulchella Swainson, [1833]

= Candalides xanthospilos =

Yellow-spot blue

Species of butterfly

Candalides xanthospilos, the yellow-spot blue, is a species of butterfly of the family Lycaenidae. It is found in along the eastern coast of Australia, including Queensland, New South Wales and Victoria.

The wingspan is about 25 mm (0.98 in). Adults are brown.

The larvae have been recorded feeding on Pimelea species, including Pimelea colorans, Pimelea latifolia, Pimelea linifolia and Pimelea ligustrina.
