= Neeressa =

Scientific classification
- Kingdom: Animalia
- Phylum: Arthropoda
- Class: Insecta
- Order: Lepidoptera
- Superfamily: Noctuoidea
- Family: Erebidae
- Subfamily: Arctiinae
- Genus: Neeressa; Hampson, 1905

Genus of moths

Neeressa is a genus of moths in the subfamily Arctiinae.

== Species ==
- Neeressa palawanensis Wileman & West, 1928
- Neeressa sagada Semper, 1898
- Neeressa whiteheadi Rothschild, 1910
