= Candalides riuensis =

Scientific classification
- Domain: Eukaryota
- Kingdom: Animalia
- Phylum: Arthropoda
- Class: Insecta
- Order: Lepidoptera
- Family: Lycaenidae
- Genus: Candalides
- Species: C. riuensis

Binomial name
- Candalides riuensis (Tite, 1963)

Synonyms
- Holochila riuensis Tite, 1963

Species of butterfly

Candalides riuensis is a species of butterfly of the family Lycaenidae. It was described by Gerald Edward Tite in 1963. It is found on the Louisiade Archipelago.
