= Candalides silicea =

Scientific classification
- Kingdom: Animalia
- Phylum: Arthropoda
- Clade: Pancrustacea
- Class: Insecta
- Order: Lepidoptera
- Family: Lycaenidae
- Genus: Candalides
- Species: C. silicea

Binomial name
- Candalides silicea (Grose-Smith, 1894)

Synonyms
- Holochila silicea Grose-Smith, 1894

Species of butterfly

Candalides silicea is a species of butterfly of the family Lycaenidae. It was described by Henley Grose-Smith in 1894. It is found in the Schouten Islands and Mefor Island in New Guinea.
