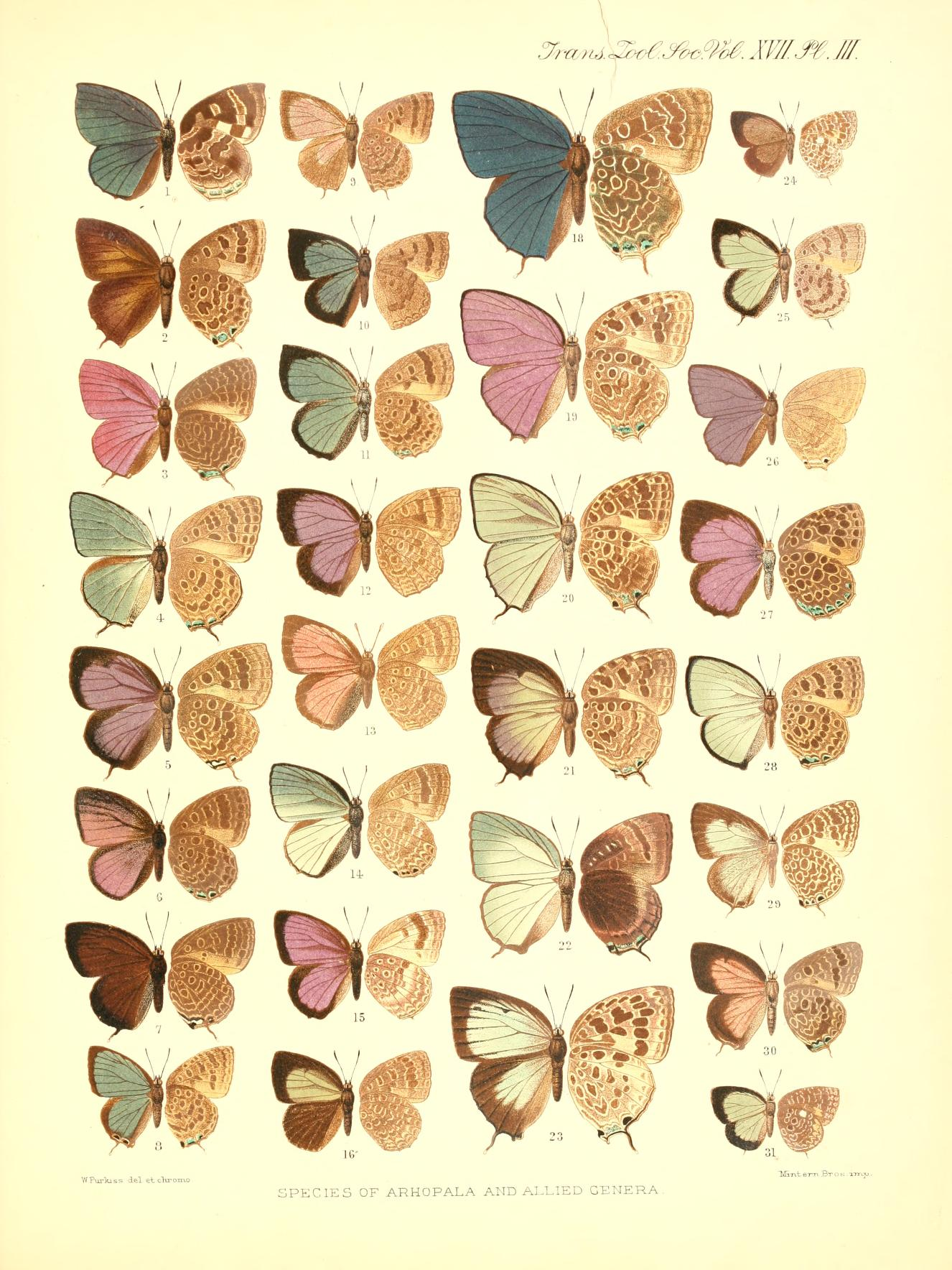
- Arhopala hesba in Bethune Baker (figure 28)

Scientific classification
- Kingdom: Animalia
- Phylum: Arthropoda
- Clade: Pancrustacea
- Class: Insecta
- Order: Lepidoptera
- Family: Lycaenidae
- Genus: Arhopala
- Species: A. hesba

Binomial name
- Arhopala hesba (Hewitson, 1869)

= Arhopala hesba =

Species of butterfly

Arhopala hesba is a butterfly in the family Lycaenidae. It was described by William Chapman Hewitson in 1869. It is found in the Indomalayan realm where it is endemic to the Philippines.

== Description ==
The male is above lustrous sky-blue, not violet as the preceding species [ agesias ] and with a black margin of 1.5 to 2 mm. Beneath the dark sepia-coloured spots are very conspicuous in the light red-brown ground-colour. The female is above similar to the male but the wings do not exhibit the bright Morpho lustre of the males.
