= Candalides cuprea =

Scientific classification
- Domain: Eukaryota
- Kingdom: Animalia
- Phylum: Arthropoda
- Class: Insecta
- Order: Lepidoptera
- Family: Lycaenidae
- Genus: Candalides
- Species: C. cuprea

Binomial name
- Candalides cuprea (Röber, 1886)

Synonyms
- Plebeius dimorphus var. cupreus Röber, 1886

Species of butterfly

Candalides cuprea is a species of butterfly of the family Lycaenidae. It was described by Röber in 1886. It is found in the western part of West Irian.
