= Candalides lamia =

Scientific classification
- Domain: Eukaryota
- Kingdom: Animalia
- Phylum: Arthropoda
- Class: Insecta
- Order: Lepidoptera
- Family: Lycaenidae
- Genus: Candalides
- Species: C. lamia

Binomial name
- Candalides lamia (Grose-Smith, 1897)

Synonyms
- Holochila lamia Grose-Smith, 1897

Species of butterfly

Candalides lamia is a species of butterfly of the family Lycaenidae. It was described by Henley Grose-Smith in 1897. It is found in Papua New Guinea on Fergusson Island and Goodenough Island.
