= Candalides afretta =

Scientific classification
- Domain: Eukaryota
- Kingdom: Animalia
- Phylum: Arthropoda
- Class: Insecta
- Order: Lepidoptera
- Family: Lycaenidae
- Genus: Candalides
- Species: C. afretta

Binomial name
- Candalides afretta Parsons, 1986

Species of butterfly

Candalides afretta is a species of butterfly of the family Lycaenidae. It was described by Parsons in 1986. It is found in Papua New Guinea.
