= Candalides pruina =

Scientific classification
- Domain: Eukaryota
- Kingdom: Animalia
- Phylum: Arthropoda
- Class: Insecta
- Order: Lepidoptera
- Family: Lycaenidae
- Genus: Candalides
- Species: C. pruina

Binomial name
- Candalides pruina Druce, 1904

Species of butterfly

Candalides pruina is a species of butterfly of the family Lycaenidae. It was described by Druce in 1904. It is found from West Irian to Papua New Guinea.
