= Macna oppositalis =

Scientific classification
- Kingdom: Animalia
- Phylum: Arthropoda
- Clade: Pancrustacea
- Class: Insecta
- Order: Lepidoptera
- Family: Pyralidae
- Genus: Macna
- Species: M. oppositalis

Binomial name
- Macna oppositalis (Walker, 1866)

Synonyms
- Curicta oppositalis Walker, 1866; Goossensia cinnamomealis Snellen, 1894; Curicta xanthochloralis Walker, [1866]; Goossensia lutealis Snellen, 1894

Species of moth

Macna oppositalis is a species of snout moth in the genus Macna. It was described by Francis Walker in 1866. It found on Aru, New Guinea and the Raja Ampat Islands.

== Subspecies ==
- Macna oppositalis oppositalis
- Macna oppositalis lutealis (Snellen, 1894) (Obi)
- Macna oppositalis hermania(1994)
