= Candalides tringa =

Scientific classification
- Domain: Eukaryota
- Kingdom: Animalia
- Phylum: Arthropoda
- Class: Insecta
- Order: Lepidoptera
- Family: Lycaenidae
- Genus: Candalides
- Species: C. tringa

Binomial name
- Candalides tringa (Grose-Smith, 1894)

Synonyms
- Holochila tringa Grose-Smith, 1894

Species of butterfly

Candalides tringa is a species of butterfly of the family Lycaenidae. It was described by Henley Grose-Smith in 1894. It is found in West Irian.
