= Candalides meforensis =

Scientific classification
- Domain: Eukaryota
- Kingdom: Animalia
- Phylum: Arthropoda
- Class: Insecta
- Order: Lepidoptera
- Family: Lycaenidae
- Genus: Candalides
- Species: C. meforensis

Binomial name
- Candalides meforensis (Tite, 1963)

Synonyms
- Holochila meforensis Tite, 1963

Species of butterfly

Candalides meforensis is a species of butterfly of the family Lycaenidae. It was described by Gerald Edward Tite in 1963. It is found in New Guinea.
