= Macna pomalis =

Scientific classification
- Kingdom: Animalia
- Phylum: Arthropoda
- Class: Insecta
- Order: Lepidoptera
- Family: Pyralidae
- Genus: Macna
- Species: M. pomalis

Binomial name
- Macna pomalis Walker, [1859]

Synonyms
- Goossensia prasinalis Ragonot, 1891; Macna prasinalis

Species of moth

Macna pomalis is a species of snout moth in the genus Macna. It was described by Francis Walker in 1859. It is found in Bhutan, Malacca and Singapore.

Adults are bright apple green. The forewings have an indistinct fine waved rufous antemedial line and indistinct fine dentate postmedial and submarginal lines, the former with a white-centred spot and the latter with a black spot. The hindwings have a slight pinkish tinge.
