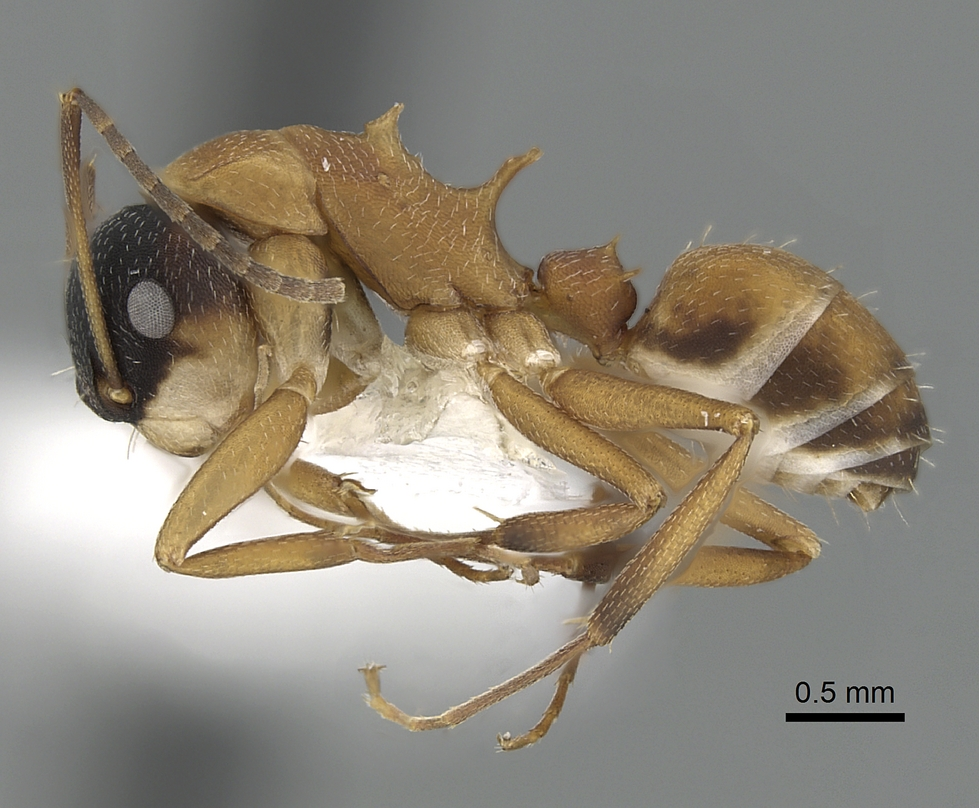
- Camponotus heathi

Scientific classification
- Kingdom: Animalia
- Phylum: Arthropoda
- Class: Insecta
- Order: Hymenoptera
- Family: Formicidae
- Subfamily: Formicinae
- Genus: Camponotus
- Subgenus: Myrmodirhachis; Emery, 1925

Species
- See text

= Myrmodirhachis =

Subgenus of insects

Myrmodirhachis, the stickle-back carpenter ants, is a subgenus of Camponotus, the carpenter ants. All known species are endemic to Central and South America.

== Species ==
As of 2024, Myrmodirhachis contains one described species and one undescribed species.

=== Described ===
- Camponotus heathi

=== Undescribed ===
- Camponotus JTL-055
