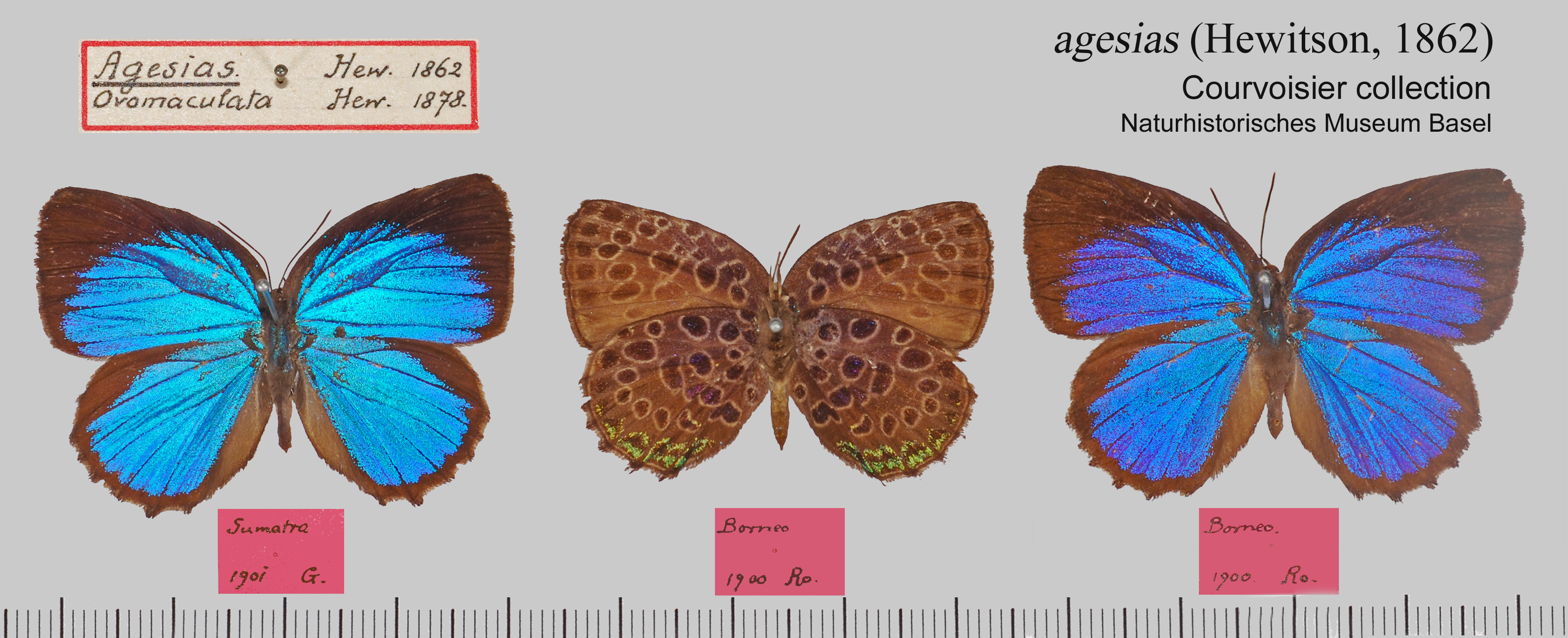

Scientific classification
- Kingdom: Animalia
- Phylum: Arthropoda
- Clade: Pancrustacea
- Class: Insecta
- Order: Lepidoptera
- Family: Lycaenidae
- Genus: Arhopala
- Species: A. agesias

Binomial name
- Arhopala agesias (Hewitson, 1862)

Synonyms
- Amblypodia agesias Hewitson, 1862; Amblypodia ovomaculata Hewitson, 1878

= Arhopala agesias =

Species of butterfly

Arhopala agesias is a species of butterfly belonging to the lycaenid family described by William Chapman Hewitson in 1862. It is found in Southeast Asia (Peninsular Malaya, Sumatra, Borneo and Pulau Laut).

Above quite similar Arhopala similis, of a violettish blue, the black margin being particularly broad in the apex of the forewing. Beneath the postmedian band is on both wings formed by a chain of distinct ring-spots which, however, are distinctly separated from each other.The metallic blue scaling in the anal portion of the hindwing is very intense and is continued to the centre of the margin; it may also be of a gold-bronze or greenish gloss.In ovomaculata Hew. (148 f as agesias) which Bethune-Baker considers to be only individually different, the antemarginal blue on the hindwing beneath is almost continued to the apex, and the discal ring-spots are so much enlarged that they are often contiguous.
