= Streptophlebia albipuncta =

Scientific classification
- Kingdom: Animalia
- Phylum: Arthropoda
- Class: Insecta
- Order: Lepidoptera
- Superfamily: Noctuoidea
- Family: Erebidae
- Subfamily: Arctiinae
- Genus: Streptophlebia
- Species: S. albipuncta

Binomial name
- Streptophlebia albipuncta (Hampson, 1898)

Synonyms
- Thylacoptera albipuncta Hampson, 1898

Species of moth

Streptophlebia albipuncta is a moth in the family Erebidae. It was described by George Hampson in 1898. It is found in the Philippines.
