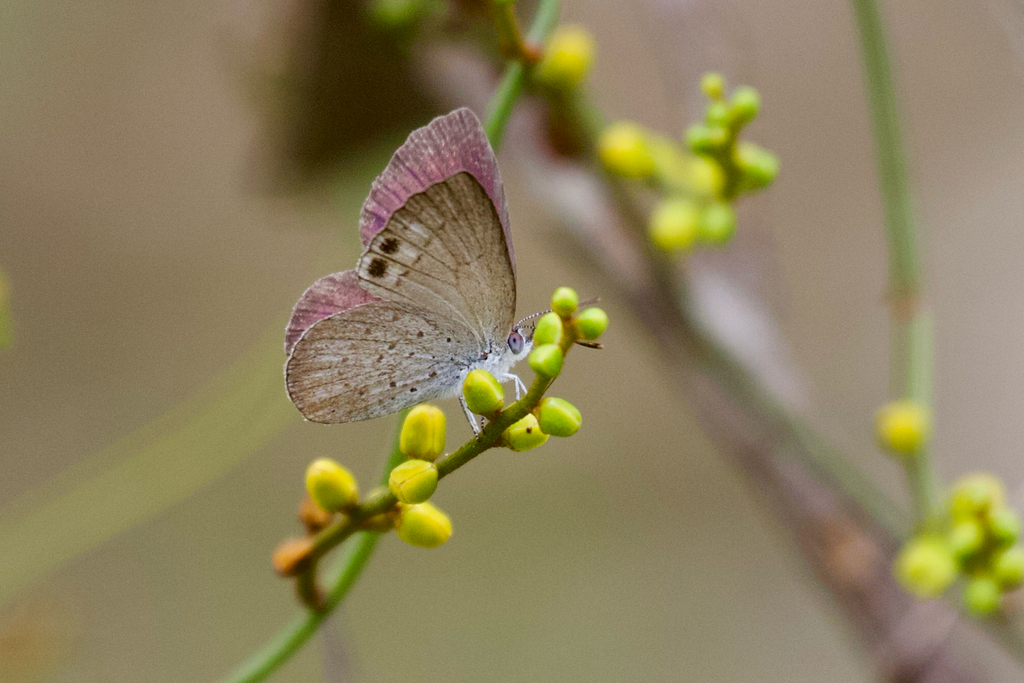

Scientific classification
- Kingdom: Animalia
- Phylum: Arthropoda
- Class: Insecta
- Order: Lepidoptera
- Family: Lycaenidae
- Genus: Candalides
- Species: C. geminus

Binomial name
- Candalides geminus Edwards & Kerr, 1978

= Candalides geminus =

Species of butterfly

Candalides geminus, the Geminus blue, is a species of butterfly of the family Lycaenidae. It was described by Edwards and Kerr in 1978. It is found in Australia (the Northern Territory, Queensland and New South Wales).

The wingspan is about 30 mm.

The larvae feed on Cassytha pubescens.
