= Macna metaxanthalis =

Scientific classification
- Kingdom: Animalia
- Phylum: Arthropoda
- Class: Insecta
- Order: Lepidoptera
- Family: Pyralidae
- Genus: Macna
- Species: M. metaxanthalis

Binomial name
- Macna metaxanthalis (Hampson, 1916)

Synonyms
- Curicta metaxanthalis Hampson, 1916

Species of moth

Macna metaxanthalis is a species of snout moth in the genus Macna. It was described by George Hampson in 1916. It is found on New Guinea.
