= Macna leitimorensis =

Scientific classification
- Domain: Eukaryota
- Kingdom: Animalia
- Phylum: Arthropoda
- Class: Insecta
- Order: Lepidoptera
- Family: Pyralidae
- Genus: Macna
- Species: M. leitimorensis

Binomial name
- Macna leitimorensis Pagenstecher, 1884

Species of moth

Macna leitimorensis is a species of snout moth in the genus Macna. It was described by Pagenstecher in 1884. It is found on Ambon Island.
