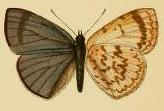

Scientific classification
- Kingdom: Animalia
- Phylum: Arthropoda
- Class: Insecta
- Order: Lepidoptera
- Family: Lycaenidae
- Genus: Candalides
- Species: C. grandissima

Binomial name
- Candalides grandissima Bethune-Baker, 1908

Synonyms
- Candalides grandis Bethune-Baker, 1906

= Candalides grandissima =

Species of butterfly

Candalides grandissima is a species of butterfly of the family Lycaenidae. It is found in New Guinea.

== Subspecies ==
- Candalides grandissima grandissima (southern New Guinea to Papua New Guinea)
- Candalides grandissima morobea Wind & Clench, 1947 (New Guinea: Morobe district)
