= Macna hampsonii =

Scientific classification
- Domain: Eukaryota
- Kingdom: Animalia
- Phylum: Arthropoda
- Class: Insecta
- Order: Lepidoptera
- Family: Pyralidae
- Genus: Macna
- Species: M. hampsonii

Binomial name
- Macna hampsonii (de Nicéville, 1896)

Synonyms
- Teratomorpha hampsonii de Nicéville, 1896

Species of moth

Macna hampsonii is a species of snout moth in the genus Macna. It was described by Lionel de Nicéville in 1896. It is found in Burma.
