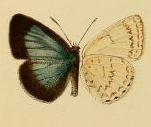

Scientific classification
- Kingdom: Animalia
- Phylum: Arthropoda
- Class: Insecta
- Order: Lepidoptera
- Family: Lycaenidae
- Genus: Candalides
- Species: C. neurapacuna

Binomial name
- Candalides neurapacuna Bethune-Baker, 1908

Synonyms
- Holochila neurapacuna

= Candalides neurapacuna =

Species of butterfly

Candalides neurapacuna is a species of butterfly of the family Lycaenidae. It is found from southern New Guinea to south-eastern Papua New Guinea.
