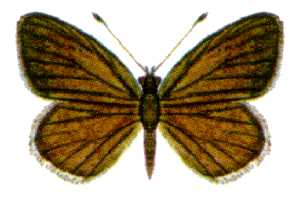

Scientific classification
- Domain: Eukaryota
- Kingdom: Animalia
- Phylum: Arthropoda
- Class: Insecta
- Order: Lepidoptera
- Family: Lycaenidae
- Genus: Candalides
- Species: C. erinus

Binomial name
- Candalides erinus (Fabricius, 1775)

Synonyms
- Papilio erinus Fabricius, 1775; Lycaena bimaculosa Doubleday, 1847; Lycaena bimaculosa Butler, 1870; Holochila bimaculosa Miskin, 1891; Plebeius tualensis Röber, 1886; Erina erina

= Candalides erinus =

Small dusky-blue

Species of butterfly

Candalides erinus, the small dusky-blue, is a species of butterfly of the family Lycaenidae. It is found in Australia and Indonesia.

The wingspan is about 20 mm.

The larvae have been recorded feeding on Cassytha aurea, Cassytha filiformis and Cassytha pubescens.

== Subspecies ==
- C. e. erinus (Darwin, Cape York to northern New South Wales)
- C. e. tualensis (Röber, 1886) (Kai Island)
- C. e. stevensi Wind & Clench, 1947 (West Irian to southern New Guinea)
- C. e. sumbensis (Tite, 1963) (Lesser Sunda Islands)
- C. e. timorensis (Tite, 1963) (Timor, Wetar, Kissar, Letti islands)
- C. e. taamensis (Tite, 1963) (Kur and Taam)
- C. e. tenimberensis (Tite, 1963) (Tanimbar islands)
- C. e. sudesta (Tite, 1963) (Tagula Island)
