= Candalides biaka =

Scientific classification
- Domain: Eukaryota
- Kingdom: Animalia
- Phylum: Arthropoda
- Class: Insecta
- Order: Lepidoptera
- Family: Lycaenidae
- Genus: Candalides
- Species: C. biaka

Binomial name
- Candalides biaka (Tite, 1963)

Synonyms
- Holochila biaka Tite, 1963

Species of butterfly

Candalides biaka is a species of butterfly of the family Lycaenidae, found on the island of Biak, in Indonesia. It was first described in 1963 by Gerald Edward Tite.
