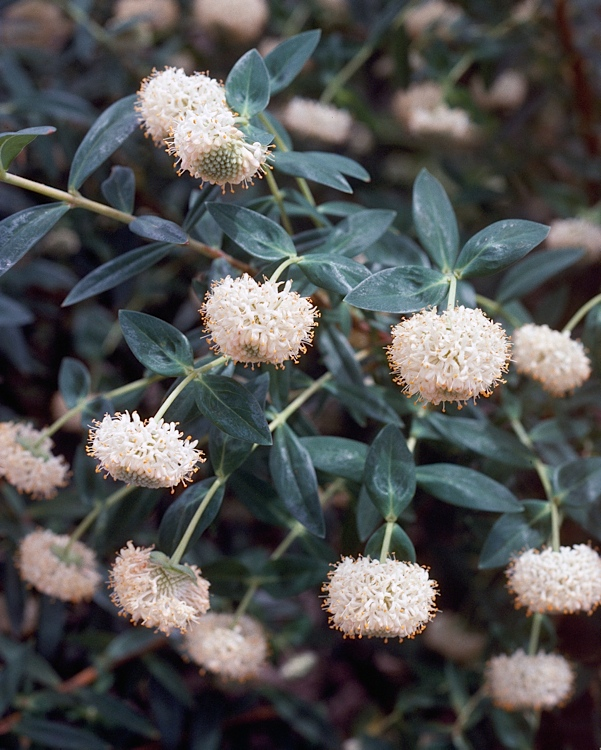
- Subspecies ligustrina in the Australian National Botanic Gardens

Scientific classification
- Kingdom: Plantae
- Clade: Tracheophytes
- Clade: Angiosperms
- Clade: Eudicots
- Clade: Rosids
- Order: Malvales
- Family: Thymelaeaceae
- Genus: Pimelea
- Species: P. ligustrina

Binomial name
- Pimelea ligustrina Labill.

Synonyms
- Banksia ligustrina (Labill.) Kuntze; Calyptrostegia ligustrina (Labill.) C.A.Mey. Pimelea elegans Lem.

= Pimelea ligustrina =

Species of plant

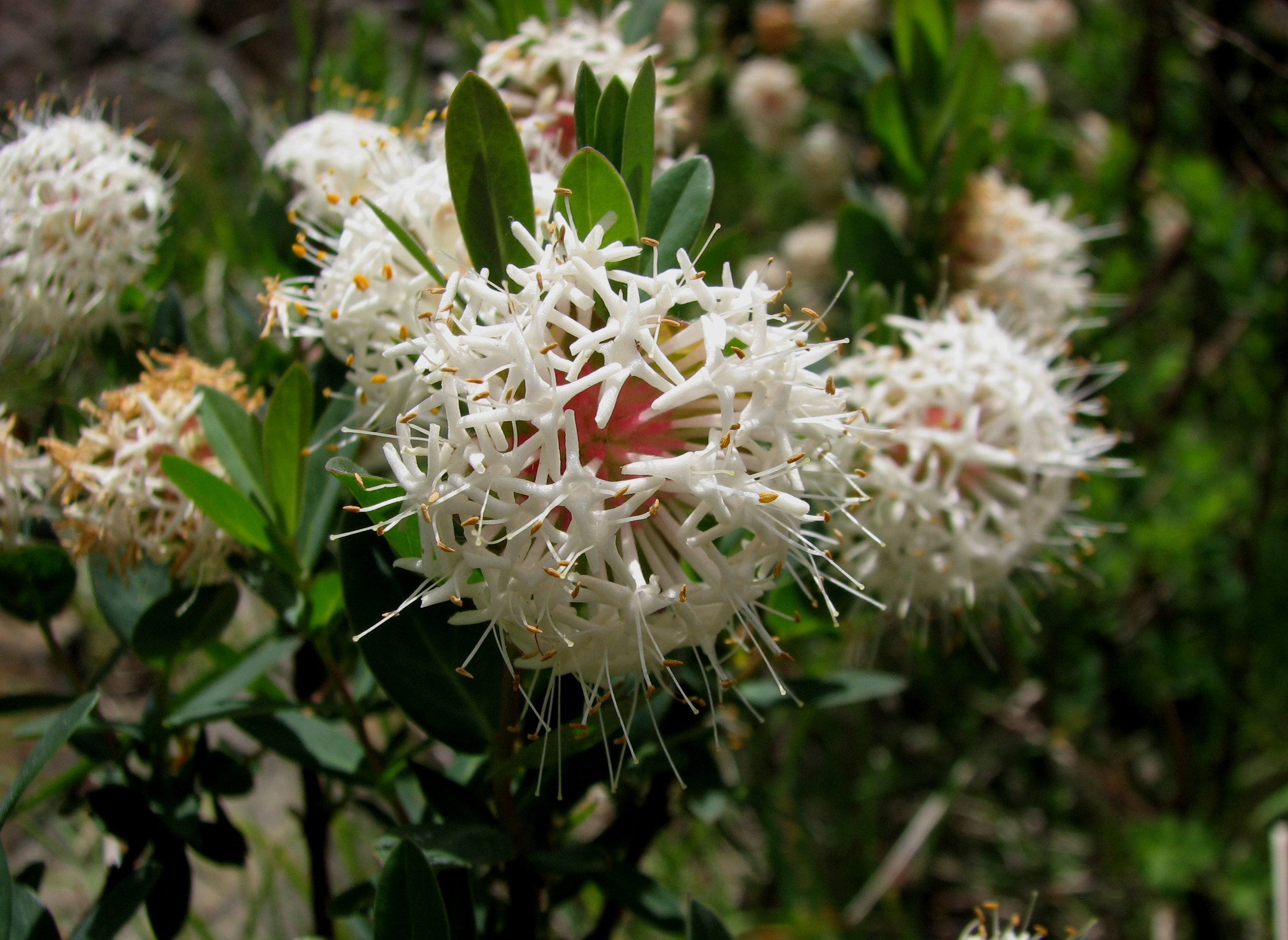
Subspecies ciliata on Mount Hotham

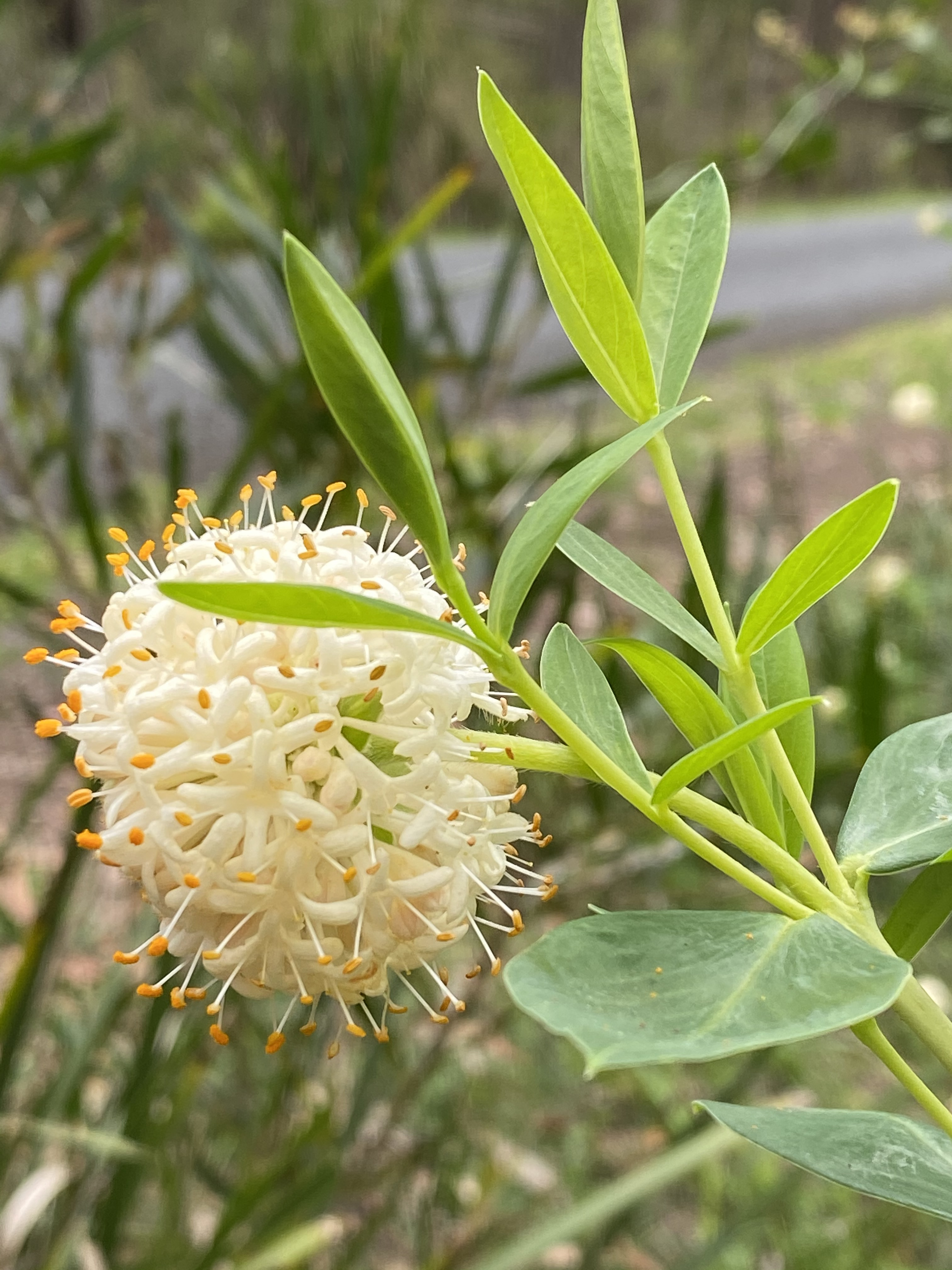
Subspecies hypericina

Pimelea ligustrina is a species of flowering plant in the family Thymelaeaceae, and is endemic to south-eastern Australia. It is a shrub with lance-shaped or narrowly elliptic leaves arranged in opposite pairs, and clusters of creamy-white, white or pinkish flowers usually surrounded by 4 or 8, greenish to reddish brown involucral bracts.

== Description ==
Pimelea ligustrina is a shrub that typically grows to a height of 0.2–3 m (7.9 in – 9 ft 10.1 in) and has glabrous stems. Its leaves are arranged in opposite pairs, lance-shaped with the narrower end towards the base or narrowly elliptic, mostly 15–90 mm (0.59–3.54 in) long and 7–20 mm (0.28–0.79 in) wide on a short petiole. The flowers are bisexual or female, creamy white or white, rarely pink, and arranged in large, erect clusters, surrounded by 4 or 8 lance-shaped to broadly elliptic involucral bracts 5–18 mm (0.20–0.71 in) long and 3–14 mm (0.12–0.55 in) wide. The floral tube is 5.5–13 mm (0.22–0.51 in) long, the sepals 1.5–5 mm (0.059–0.197 in) long and hairy on the outside. Flowering time varies with subspecies. The fruit is green and 3–5 mm (0.12–0.20 in) long.

== Taxonomy ==
Pimelea ligustrina was first formally described in 1805 by French naturalist Jacques Labillardière in his Novae Hollandiae Plantarum Specimen.

In 1983, S. Threlfall described three subspecies of P. ligustrina in the journal Brunonia and the names are accepted by the Australian Plant Census:

- Pimelea ligustrina subsp. ciliata Threlfall is a shrub up to 1.5 m (4 ft 11 in) high with elliptic leaves mostly 15–40 mm (0.59–1.57 in) long, and heads of 20 to 70 flowers on a glabrous peduncle, mainly from February to March.
- Pimelea ligustrina subsp. hypericina (A.Cunn.) Threlfall is a shrub 1–3 m (3 ft 3 in – 9 ft 10 in) high with leaves lance-shaped with the narrower end towards the base to elliptic, mostly 30–60 mm (1.2–2.4 in) long, and heads of 36 to more than 150 flowers on a peduncle that has short, fine hairs, in September and October.
- Pimelea ligustrina Labill. subsp. ligustrina is a shrub up to 2 m (6 ft 7 in) high with variably-shaped leaves mostly 20–60 mm (0.79–2.36 in) long, and heads of 15 to 130 flowers on a glabrous peduncle, mainly from October to December.

== Distribution and habitat ==
This pimelea occurs in the A.C.T. and all states of Australia, except Western Australia. Subspecies ciliata grows in forest, snow gum woodland and heath above 1,400 m (4,600 ft) south from the Brindabella Range in New South Wales, the A.C.T. and eastern Victoria. Subspecies hypericina grows on the margins of wet forest and rainforest, mainly between the Gibraltar Range and Mount Cambewarra in New South Wales. Subspecies ligustrina is widely distributed in forest below 1,400 m (4,600 ft) in south-east Queensland, eastern New South Wales, the A.C.T., southern Victoria, the far south-east of South Australia, and in Tasmania.

== Ecology ==
This pimelea is a food plant for caterpillars of the yellow-spot blue butterfly.

== Conservation status ==
Subspecies ciliata is listed as "endangered" under the Victorian Government Flora and Fauna Guarantee Act 1988.
