= Streptophlebia obliquistria =

Scientific classification
- Kingdom: Animalia
- Phylum: Arthropoda
- Class: Insecta
- Order: Lepidoptera
- Superfamily: Noctuoidea
- Family: Erebidae
- Subfamily: Arctiinae
- Genus: Streptophlebia
- Species: S. obliquistria

Binomial name
- Streptophlebia obliquistria Hampson, 1898

Species of moth

Streptophlebia obliquistria is a moth in the family Erebidae. It was described by George Hampson in 1898. It is found on Borneo.
