= Streptophlebia bicellulata =

Scientific classification
- Domain: Eukaryota
- Kingdom: Animalia
- Phylum: Arthropoda
- Class: Insecta
- Order: Lepidoptera
- Superfamily: Noctuoidea
- Family: Erebidae
- Subfamily: Arctiinae
- Genus: Streptophlebia
- Species: S. bicellulata

Binomial name
- Streptophlebia bicellulata (Kaye, 1918)

Synonyms
- Crinophora bicellulata Kaye, 1918

Species of moth

Streptophlebia bicellulata is a moth of the family Erebidae first described by William James Kaye in 1918. It is found on the Philippines.
