= Macna platychloralis =

Scientific classification
- Kingdom: Animalia
- Phylum: Arthropoda
- Class: Insecta
- Order: Lepidoptera
- Family: Pyralidae
- Genus: Macna
- Species: M. platychloralis

Binomial name
- Macna platychloralis (Walker, [1866])

Synonyms
- Rhabana platychloralis Walker, 1866

Species of moth

Macna platychloralis is a species of snout moth in the genus Macna. It was described by Francis Walker in 1866. It is found on Java.
