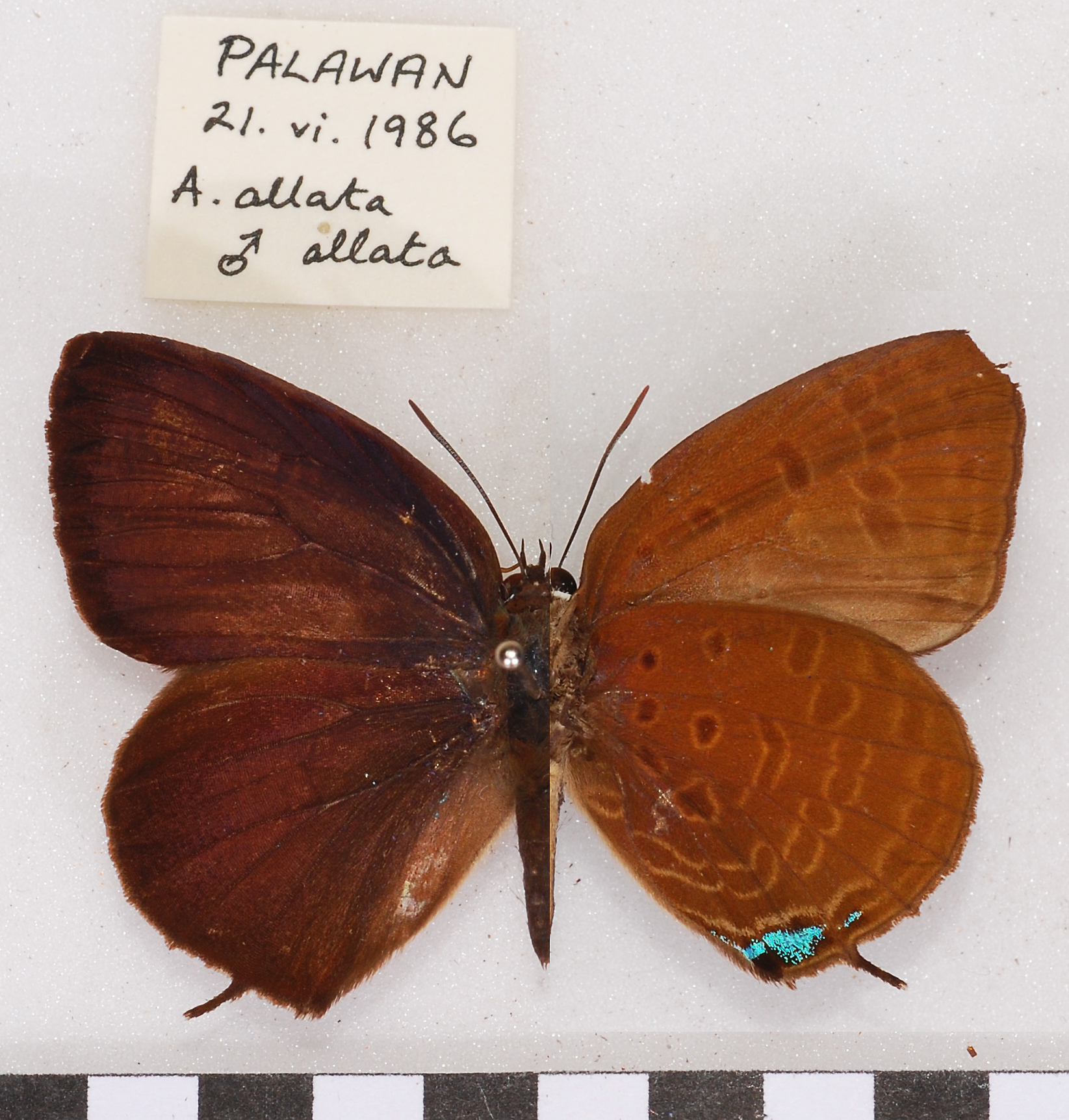
- A. a. allata

Scientific classification
- Kingdom: Animalia
- Phylum: Arthropoda
- Clade: Pancrustacea
- Class: Insecta
- Order: Lepidoptera
- Family: Lycaenidae
- Genus: Arhopala
- Species: A. allata

Binomial name
- Arhopala allata (Staudinger, 1889)

Synonyms
- Amblypodia allata Staudinger, 1889; Arhopala pandora Corbet, 1941

= Arhopala allata =

Species of butterfly

Arhopala allata is a butterfly of the family Lycaenidae. It is found in Asia (see subspecies section).

A. allata Stgr. is distinguished from anamuta by the much broader black distal margin in both wings of the male and female. The upper surface of the male is deep dark brown with a violet reflection; so dark that the marginal band of 2% mm width only contrasts with the almost black ground-colour in a certain light.Female dark bluish-violet, both wings very broadly margined with black. On the under surface the only essential difference from anamuta is the much narrower postmedian band of the forewing and the straighter course of it in the hindwing of allata.

== Subspecies ==
- A. a. allata (Staudinger, 1889) (Palawan, Mindanao)
- A. a. atarana (Tytler, 1926) (Burma, Shan States, Ataran)
- A. a. suffusa (Tytler, 1915) - previously Amblypodia suffusa, commonly known as Tytler's rosy oakblue (Manipur)
- A. a. pandora Corbet, 1941 (Peninsular Malaya, Sumatra)
- A. a. evandra Corbet (Borneo)
- A. a. pambihira (Takanami, 1982) (Philippines)
