= Macna =

Scientific classification
- Kingdom: Animalia
- Phylum: Arthropoda
- Class: Insecta
- Order: Lepidoptera
- Family: Pyralidae
- Tribe: Pyralini
- Genus: Macna; Walker, 1859

Synonyms
- Gatesclarkeia Orfila & Rossi, 1956; Curicta Walker, 1866; Goossensia Ragonot, 1891; Plinthopa Bethune-Baker, 1908; Rhabana Walker, 1866; Teratomorpha Nicéville, 1896

Genus of moths

Macna is a genus of snout moths. It was described by Francis Walker in 1859.

== Species ==
- Macna atrirufalis Hampson, 1897
- Macna camiguina Semper, 1899
- Macna coelocrossa
- Macna darabitalis (Snellen, 1895)
- Macna hampsonii Nicéville, 1896
- Macna ignebasalis Hampson, 1897
- Macna leitimorensis Pagenstecher, 1884
- Macna metaxanthalis Hampson, 1916
- Macna minanga Semper, 1899
- Macna oppositalis (Walker, 1866)
- Macna platychloralis Walker, [1866]
- Macna pomalis Walker, [1859]
- Macna rubra Bethune-Baker, 1908
- Macna rufus Bethune-Baker, 1908
