= Macna darabitalis =

Scientific classification
- Kingdom: Animalia
- Phylum: Arthropoda
- Class: Insecta
- Order: Lepidoptera
- Family: Pyralidae
- Genus: Macna
- Species: M. darabitalis

Binomial name
- Macna darabitalis (Snellen, 1895)

Synonyms
- Goossensia darabitalis Snellen, 1895

Species of moth

Macna darabitalis is a species of snout moth in the genus Macna. It was described by Pieter Cornelius Tobias Snellen in 1895. It is found on Java.
