= Macna atrirufalis =

Scientific classification
- Kingdom: Animalia
- Phylum: Arthropoda
- Class: Insecta
- Order: Lepidoptera
- Family: Pyralidae
- Genus: Macna
- Species: M. atrirufalis

Binomial name
- Macna atrirufalis Hampson, 1897

Species of moth

Macna atrirufalis is a species of snout moth in the genus Macna. It was described by George Hampson in 1897. It is found in New Guinea and on Ambon Island.
