= Macna ignebasalis =

Scientific classification
- Kingdom: Animalia
- Phylum: Arthropoda
- Class: Insecta
- Order: Lepidoptera
- Family: Pyralidae
- Genus: Macna
- Species: M. ignebasalis

Binomial name
- Macna ignebasalis Hampson, 1897

Species of moth

Macna ignebasalis is a species of snout moth in the genus Macna. It was described by George Hampson in 1897. It is found in New Guinea.
