= Neeressa whiteheadi =

Scientific classification
- Domain: Eukaryota
- Kingdom: Animalia
- Phylum: Arthropoda
- Class: Insecta
- Order: Lepidoptera
- Superfamily: Noctuoidea
- Family: Erebidae
- Subfamily: Arctiinae
- Genus: Neeressa
- Species: N. whiteheadi

Binomial name
- Neeressa whiteheadi Rothschild, 1910

Species of moth

Neeressa whiteheadi is a moth of the subfamily Arctiinae. It was described by Rothschild in 1910. It is found in the Philippines (Luzon).
