= Macna rubra =

Scientific classification
- Domain: Eukaryota
- Kingdom: Animalia
- Phylum: Arthropoda
- Class: Insecta
- Order: Lepidoptera
- Family: Pyralidae
- Genus: Macna
- Species: M. rubra

Binomial name
- Macna rubra (Bethune-Baker, 1908)

Synonyms
- Plinthopa rubra Bethune-Baker, 1908

Species of moth

Macna rubra is a species of snout moth in the genus Macna. It was described by George Thomas Bethune-Baker in 1908. It is found in New Guinea.

The wingspan is about 48 mm. The forewings are bright red from the base to the antemedian line. There is a short oblique dark basal line. The postmedian line is dark crenulate and the area between this line and the antemedian is reddish grey. The terminal area is reddish grey and the wing is more or less finely irrorated with black. The hindwings are uniform greyish brown, with a terminal band of reddish. Adults have been recorded from January to March.
