= Macna rufus =

Scientific classification
- Domain: Eukaryota
- Kingdom: Animalia
- Phylum: Arthropoda
- Class: Insecta
- Order: Lepidoptera
- Family: Pyralidae
- Genus: Macna
- Species: M. rufus

Binomial name
- Macna rufus (Bethune-Baker, 1908)

Synonyms
- Camptochilus rufus Bethune-Baker, 1908

Species of moth

Macna rufus is a species of snout moth in the genus Macna. It was described by George Thomas Bethune-Baker in 1908. It is found in New Guinea.
