= Streptophlebia =

Scientific classification
- Kingdom: Animalia
- Phylum: Arthropoda
- Class: Insecta
- Order: Lepidoptera
- Superfamily: Noctuoidea
- Family: Erebidae
- Subfamily: Arctiinae
- Tribe: Syntomini
- Genus: Streptophlebia; Hampson, 1898

Synonyms
- Thylacoptera Hampson, 1898; Symphlebomis Hampson, 1905; Crinophora Kaye, 1918

Genus of moths

Streptophlebia is a genus of moths in the family Erebidae erected by George Hampson in 1898.

== Species ==
- Streptophlebia albipuncta (Hampson, 1898)
- Streptophlebia antipolo (Semper, 1898)
- Streptophlebia bicellulata (Kaye, 1918)
- Streptophlebia obliquistria Hampson, 1898
