= Candalides ardosiacea =

Scientific classification
- Domain: Eukaryota
- Kingdom: Animalia
- Phylum: Arthropoda
- Class: Insecta
- Order: Lepidoptera
- Family: Lycaenidae
- Genus: Candalides
- Species: C. ardosiacea

Binomial name
- Candalides ardosiacea (Tite, 1963)

Synonyms
- Holochila ardosiacea Tite, 1963

Species of butterfly

Candalides ardosiacea is a species of butterfly of the family Lycaenidae. It was described by Gerald Edward Tite in 1963. It is found on the Aru Islands and from West Irian to Papua New Guinea.
