= Candalides coerulea =

Scientific classification
- Domain: Eukaryota
- Kingdom: Animalia
- Phylum: Arthropoda
- Class: Insecta
- Order: Lepidoptera
- Family: Lycaenidae
- Genus: Candalides
- Species: C. coerulea

Binomial name
- Candalides coerulea (Röber, 1886)

Synonyms
- Plebeius dimorphus var. coeruleus Röber, 1886; Holochila subrosea Grose-Smith, 1894; Holochila coerulea doreia Tite, 1963

Species of butterfly

Candalides coerulea is a species of butterfly of the family Lycaenidae. It was described by Röber in 1886. It is found on the Aru Islands and in West Irian.

== Subspecies ==
- Candalides coerulea coerulea (Aru)
- Candalides coerulea subrosea (Grose-Smith, 1894) (West Irian: Humboldt Bay)
- Candalides coerulea doreia (Tite, 1963) (north-western West Irian, Mount Goliath)
