= Candalides parsonsi =

Scientific classification
- Domain: Eukaryota
- Kingdom: Animalia
- Phylum: Arthropoda
- Class: Insecta
- Order: Lepidoptera
- Family: Lycaenidae
- Genus: Candalides
- Species: C. parsonsi

Binomial name
- Candalides parsonsi Tennent, 2005

Species of butterfly

Candalides parsonsi is a species of butterfly of the family Lycaenidae. It was described by W. John Tennent in 2005. It is found on Normanby Island, Papua New Guinea.
