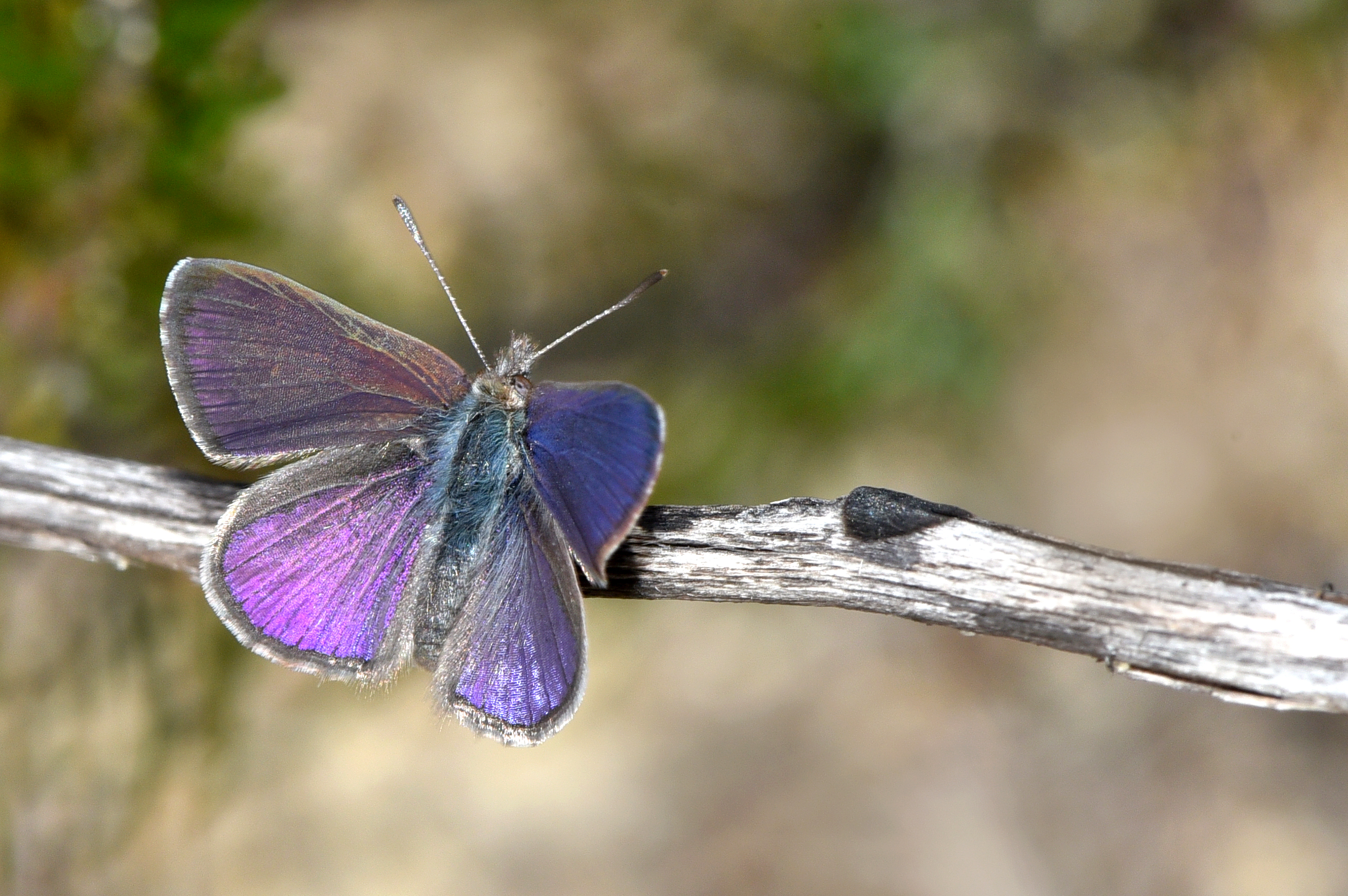

Scientific classification
- Domain: Eukaryota
- Kingdom: Animalia
- Phylum: Arthropoda
- Class: Insecta
- Order: Lepidoptera
- Family: Lycaenidae
- Genus: Candalides
- Species: C. acasta

Binomial name
- Candalides acasta (Cox, 1873)

Synonyms
- Lycaena acasta Cox, 1873; Holochila anita Semper, [1879]; Lycaena moerens Rosenstock, 1885; Lycaena canescens Miskin, 1890; Erina acasta

= Candalides acasta =

Blotched blue

Species of butterfly

Candalides acasta, the blotched blue, is a species of butterfly of the family Lycaenidae. It is found in southern Australia, including Queensland, New South Wales, Victoria, Tasmania, South Australia and Western Australia.
