= Macna coelocrossa =

Scientific classification
- Domain: Eukaryota
- Kingdom: Animalia
- Phylum: Arthropoda
- Class: Insecta
- Order: Lepidoptera
- Family: Pyralidae
- Genus: Macna
- Species: M. coelocrossa

Binomial name
- Macna coelocrossa (Turner, 1911)

Synonyms
- Curicta coelocrossa Turner, 1911

Species of moth

Macna coelocrossa is a species of snout moth in the genus Macna. It was described by Alfred Jefferis Turner in 1911. It is found in Australia.
