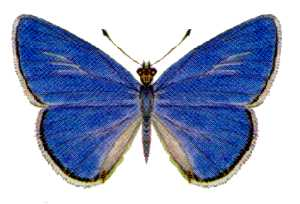

Scientific classification
- Kingdom: Animalia
- Phylum: Arthropoda
- Class: Insecta
- Order: Lepidoptera
- Family: Lycaenidae
- Genus: Candalides
- Species: C. gilberti

Binomial name
- Candalides gilberti Waterhouse, 1903

Synonyms
- Holochila gilberti

= Candalides gilberti =

Northern pencil-blue

Species of butterfly

Candalides gilberti, the northern pencil-blue, is a species of butterfly of the family Lycaenidae. It is found in Australia in the Northern Territory and the north of Western Australia.

== Appearance ==
The wingspan is about 30 mm. Adults are blue.

The larvae have been recorded feeding on Decaisnina signata and Alstonia actinophylla. Pupation takes place in a mottled brown pupa with a length of about 14 mm.
