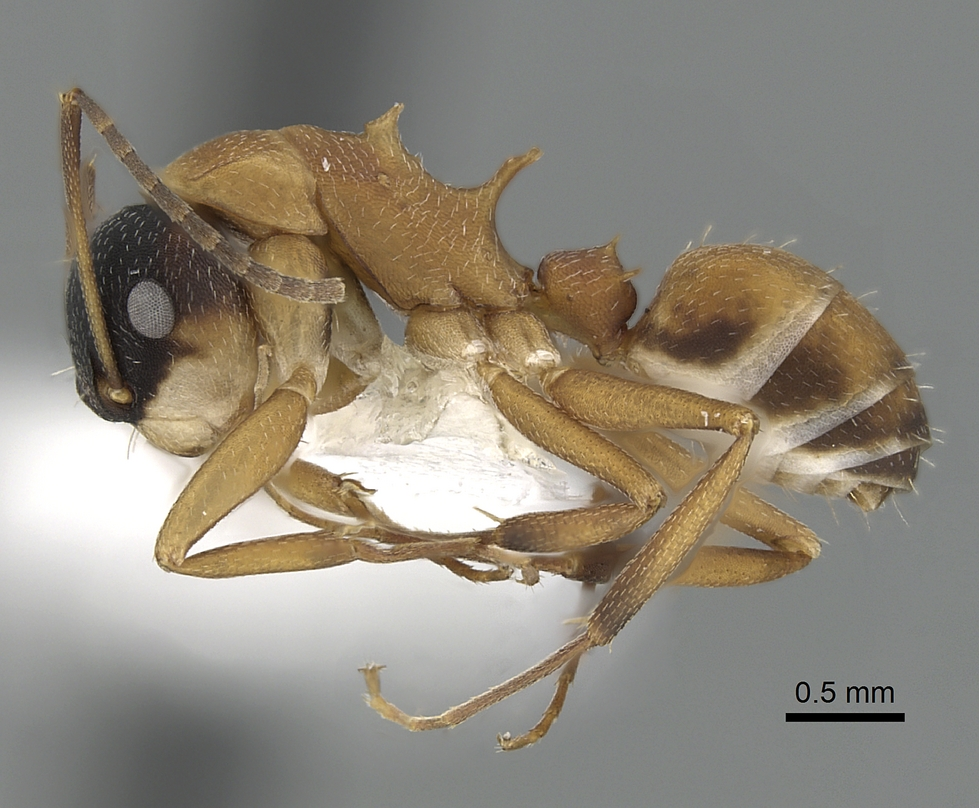

Scientific classification
- Domain: Eukaryota
- Kingdom: Animalia
- Phylum: Arthropoda
- Class: Insecta
- Order: Hymenoptera
- Family: Formicidae
- Subfamily: Formicinae
- Genus: Camponotus
- Subgenus: Myrmodirhachis
- Species: C. heathi

Binomial name
- Camponotus heathi Mann, 1916

Subspecies
- C. heathi gilvigaster Wheeler, 1923

= Camponotus heathi =

Species of ant

Camponotus heathi is a species of carpenter ant native to Brazil, Peru, Bolivia, French Guiana, and Colombia. C. heathi is the only described species in the subgenus Myrmodirhachis, although another undescribed species Camponotus JTL-055 shares similar traits.
