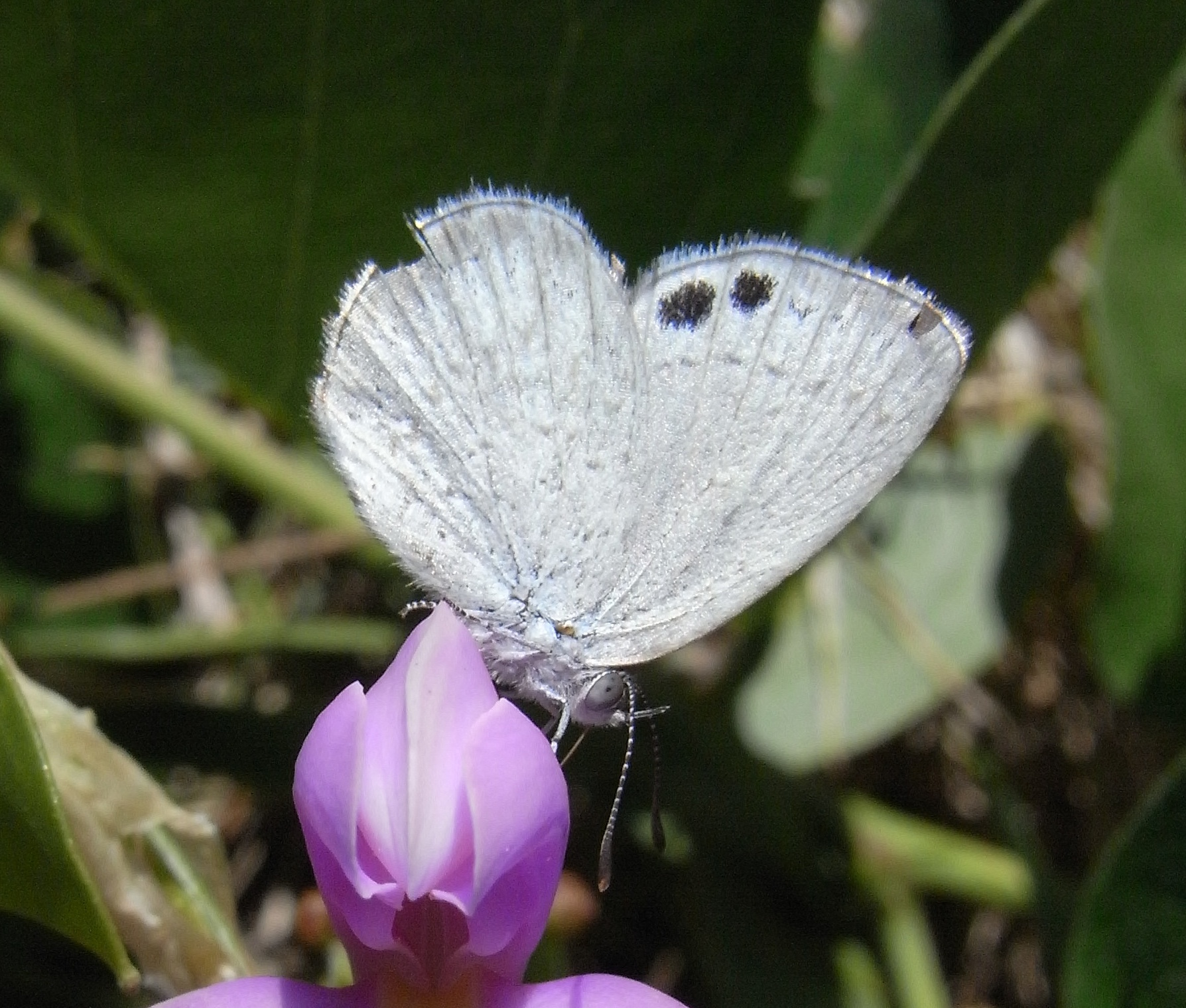
- Candalides hyacinthina sitting on a bay bean

Scientific classification
- Kingdom: Animalia
- Phylum: Arthropoda
- Clade: Pancrustacea
- Class: Insecta
- Order: Lepidoptera
- Family: Lycaenidae
- Genus: Candalides; Hübner, 1819

Synonyms
- Cyprotides Tite, 1963; Erina Swainson, 1833; Holochila C.Felder, 1862; Microscena Tite, 1963; Polycyma Felder, 1862 (invalid); Polycyma Scott, 1890 (unavailable)

= Candalides =

Butterfly genus in family Lycaenidae

Candalides is a large genus of butterflies in the family Lycaenidae. The species of this genus are found in the Australasian realm.

== Species ==
- Candalides absimilis (C. Felder, 1862)
- Candalides acasta (Cox, 1873)
- Candalides afretta Parsons, 1986
- Candalides ardosiacea (Tite, 1963)
- Candalides biaka (Tite, 1963)
- Candalides coerulea (Röber, 1886)
- Candalides consimilis Waterhouse, 1942
- Candalides cuprea (Röber, 1886)
- Candalides cyprotus (Olliff, 1886)
- Candalides erinus (Fabricius, 1775)
- Candalides geminus Edwards & Kerr, 1978
- Candalides gilberti Waterhouse, 1903
- Candalides grandissima Bethune-Baker, 1908
- Candalides heathi (Cox, 1873)
- Candalides helenita (Semper, [1879])
- Candalides hyacinthina (Semper, [1879])
- Candalides lamia (Grose-Smith, 1897)
- Candalides limbata (Tite, 1963)
- Candalides margarita (Semper, [1879])
- Candalides meforensis (Tite, 1963)
- Candalides neurapacuna Bethune-Baker, 1908
- Candalides parsonsi Tennent, 2005
- Candalides pruina Druce, 1904
- Candalides riuensis (Tite, 1963)
- Candalides silicea (Grose-Smith, 1894)
- Candalides tringa (Grose-Smith, 1894)
- Candalides viriditincta (Tite, 1963)
- Candalides xanthospilos (Hübner, [1817])
