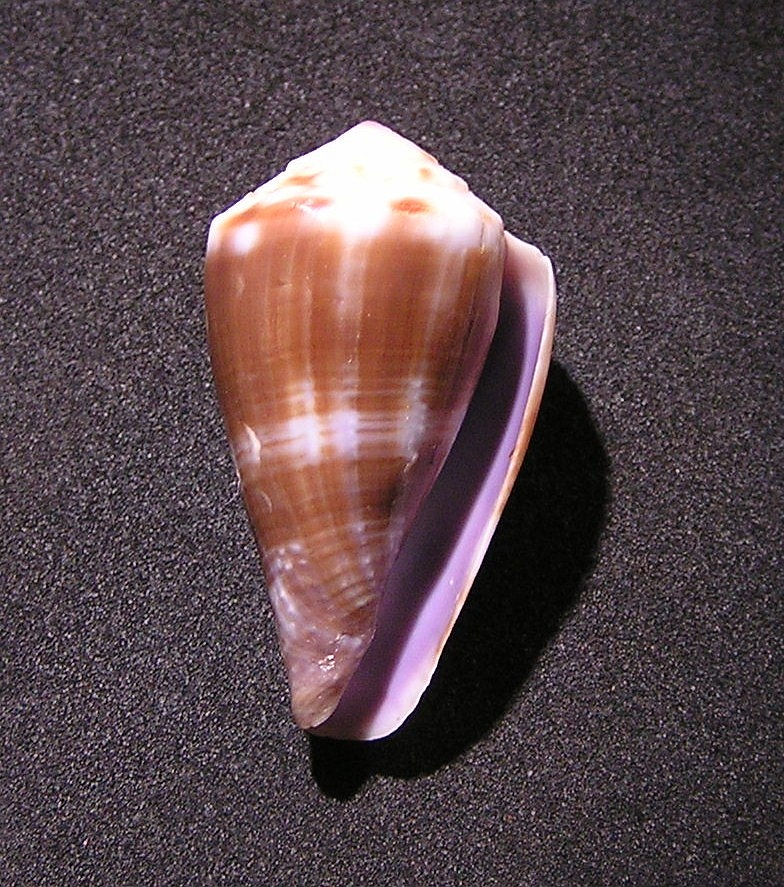
- Apertural view of a shell of Conus balteatus

Conservation status
- Least Concern (IUCN 3.1)

Scientific classification
- Kingdom: Animalia
- Phylum: Mollusca
- Class: Gastropoda
- Subclass: Caenogastropoda
- Order: Neogastropoda
- Superfamily: Conoidea
- Family: Conidae
- Genus: Conus
- Species: C. balteatus

Binomial name
- Conus balteatus G. B. Sowerby I, 1833

Synonyms
- Conus (Coronaxis) cernicus H. Adams, 1869; Conus (Floraconus) balteatus G. B. Sowerby I, 1833 · accepted, alternate representation; Conus (Rhizoconus) anosyensis Bozzetti, 2008; Conus (Splinoconus) gilberti (Bozzetti, 2012); Conus (Splinoconus) olgiatii Bozzetti, 2007; Conus anosyensis Bozzetti, 2008; Conus balteatus pigmentatus A. Adams & Reeve, 1848; Conus cernicus H. Adams, 1869; Conus circumclausus Fenaux, 1942; Conus gilberti (Bozzetti, 2012); Conus moussoni Crosse, 1865; Conus olgiatii Bozzetti, 2007; Conus pigmentatus Adams A. and Reeve L.A. 1848; Conus propinquus E. A. Smith, 1877; Conus tenuisulcatus G. B. Sowerby II, 1873; Dendroconus balteatus (G. B. Sowerby I, 1833); Nitidoconus balteatus (G. B. Sowerby I, 1833); Nitidoconus gilberti (Bozzetti, 2012); Rhizoconus anosyensis (Bozzetti, 2008); Rolaniconus balteatus cernicus (f) "Barclay, D.W. MS" Adams, H.G., 1869

= Conus balteatus =

Species of sea snail

Conus balteatus, common name the Mauritian cone, is a species of sea snail, a marine gastropod mollusk in the family Conidae, the cone snails and their allies.

Like all species within the genus Conus, these snails are predatory and venomous. They are capable of stinging humans, therefore live ones should be handled carefully or not at all.

The subspecies: Conus balteatus pigmentatus A. Adams & Reeve, 1848 is accepted as Conus balteatus G. B. Sowerby I, 1833

== Description ==
The size of an adult shell varies between 13 mm and 42 mm. The shell is olive-brown or brown violaceous, with a more or less irregular white band below the middle, and another one below the tuberculated spire. The interior of the aperture is tinged with violet.

== Distribution ==
This species occurs in the Indian Ocean off the Mascarene Basin, southeast Madagascar and in the Western Pacific Ocean (New Caledonia, Vanuatu, Papua New Guinea)

== Gallery ==
Below are several color forms and one subspecies:

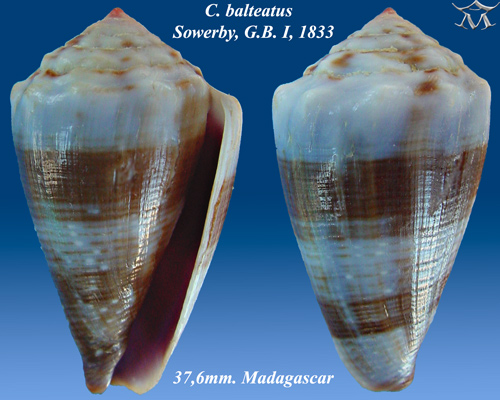
Conus balteatus Sowerby, G.B. I, 1833

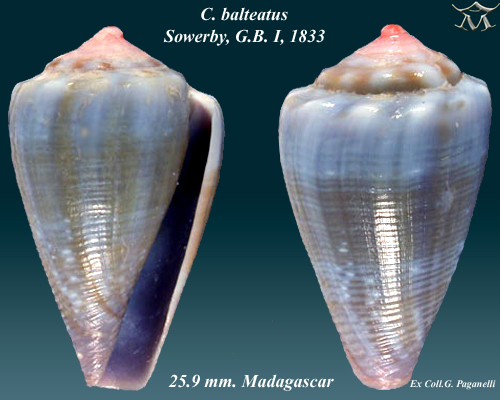
Conus balteatus Sowerby, G.B. I, 1833

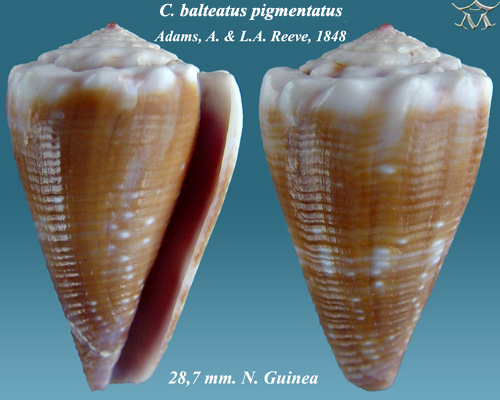
Conus balteatus pigmentatus Adams, A. & L.A. Reeve, 1848
