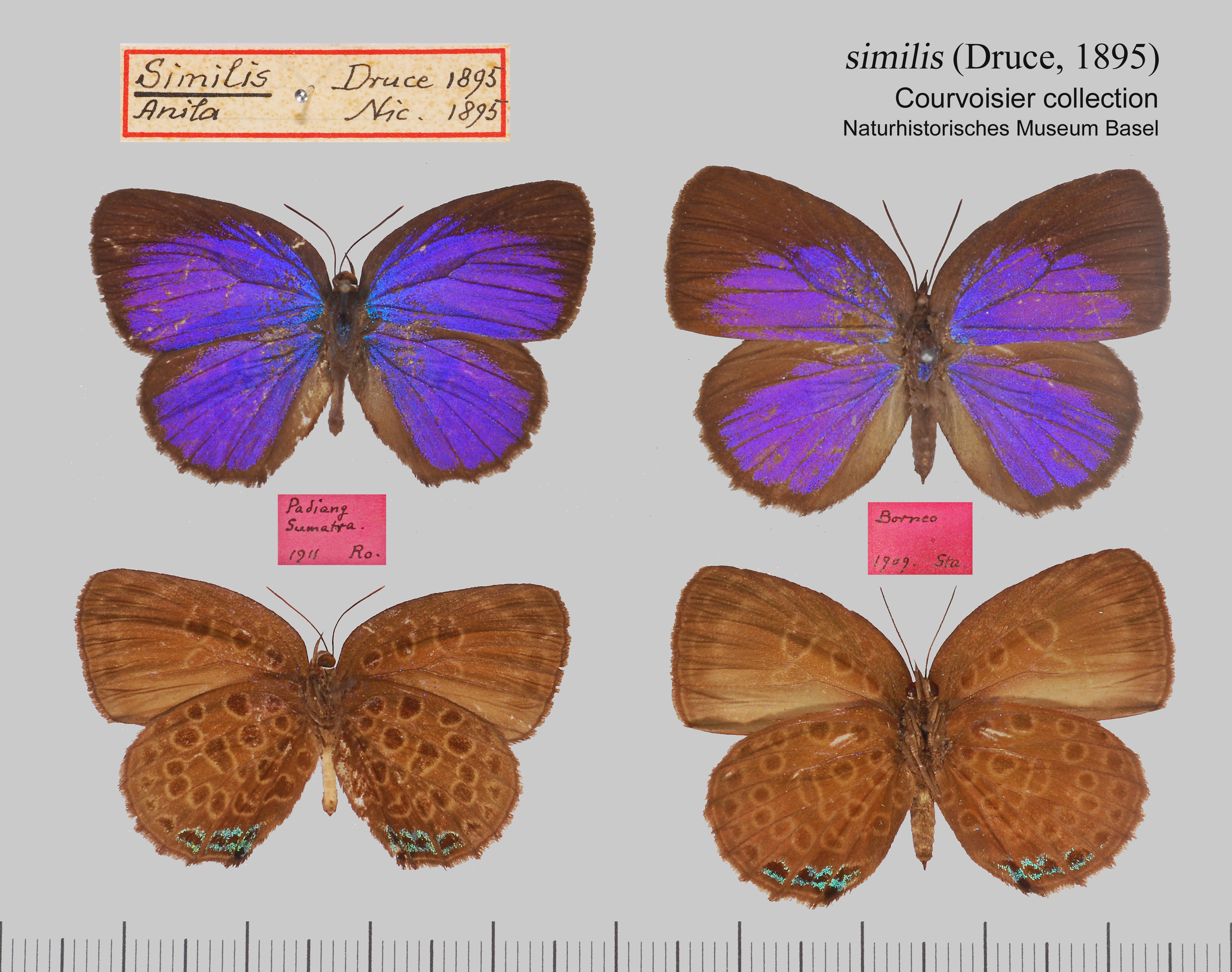

Scientific classification
- Kingdom: Animalia
- Phylum: Arthropoda
- Clade: Pancrustacea
- Class: Insecta
- Order: Lepidoptera
- Family: Lycaenidae
- Genus: Arhopala
- Species: A. similis

Binomial name
- Arhopala similis (H. H. Druce, 1895)

Synonyms
- Arhopala anila de Nicéville, [1896]

= Arhopala similis =

Species of butterfly

Arhopala similis is a species of butterfly belonging to the lycaenid family described by Hamilton Herbert Druce in 1895. It is found in Southeast Asia (Peninsular Malaya, Sumatra, Borneo, Lingga). In this species, contrary to Arhopala catori, all the 4 spots in the costal area of the hindwing beneath are distinctly developed and in distinct light rings. In the forewing the postmedian transverse band is entirely absent, whilst in the hindwing it is broken up into hardly contiguous rings. Above the male is still more broadly margined with black than A. catori, particularly in the apex; the female is very similar to it, lighter blue.
