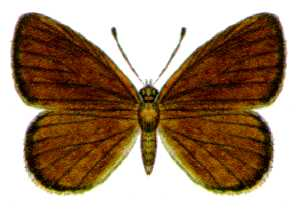

Scientific classification
- Domain: Eukaryota
- Kingdom: Animalia
- Phylum: Arthropoda
- Class: Insecta
- Order: Lepidoptera
- Family: Lycaenidae
- Genus: Candalides
- Species: C. heathi

Binomial name
- Candalides heathi (Cox, 1873)

Synonyms
- Lycaena heathi Cox, 1873; Microsema heathi; Lycaena paradoxa Guest, 1882

= Candalides heathi =

Rayed blue

Species of butterfly

Candalides heathi, the rayed blue, is a species of butterfly of the family Lycaenidae. It is found in southern Australia, including South Australia, New South Wales and Victoria.

The wingspan is about 30 mm.

The larvae have been recorded feeding on Pimelea species, Eremophila longifolia, Plantago species and Derwentia derwentiana.

== Subspecies ==
- C. h. heathi (coastal central Queensland to Western Australia)
- C. h. aerata (Montague, 1914) (Western Australia (Monte Bello Island, Geraldton)
- C. h. alpina Waterhouse, 1928 (Mount Kosciuszko, Brindabella Range)
- C. h. doddi Burns, [1948] (New South Wales (Barrington Tops, Dorrigo))
