= Georg Semper =

German entomologist (1837–1909)

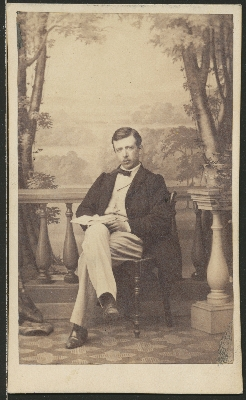
Georg Semper 1863

Georg Semper (August 3, 1837 in Altona, Hamburg – February 21, 1909) was a German entomologist who specialised in Lepidoptera.

His Philippine Lepidoptera are in Senckenberg Museum, Frankfurt am Main and his Indomalaya and Australasia specimens are in Staatliches Museum für Tierkunde Dresden. His European insects are in Museum Schleswig-Holstein, Landesk and in the zoological collections of the University of Hamburg. He wrote "Beitrag zur Rhopalocerenfauna von Australien" in the Journal des Museum Godeffroy 14: 138-194, pls 8, 9 (1878) and Die Schmetterlinge der Philippinischen Inseln. Beitrage zur Indo-Malayischen Lepidopteren-fauna. Zweiter Band. Die Nachtfalter. Heterocera Reisen Archipel. Philipp. 2: 381-728 (1896–1902). He worked in association with Museum Godeffroy.

Otto Semper and Carl Semper were his half brothers by their father's first wife.
