= Green wattle =

Green wattle may refer to any of these plants native to Australia:

- Acacia deanei
- Acacia decurrens, also known as Sydney green wattle
- Acacia filicifolia, also known as fern-leaved wattle
- Acacia irrorata, also known as Sydney green wattle
- Acacia mearnsii
- Acacia parramattensis, known as Parramatta green wattle or Sydney Green Wattle
- Acacia trineura
