= Climate history of Sydney =

History of climatic conditions in Sydney, Australia

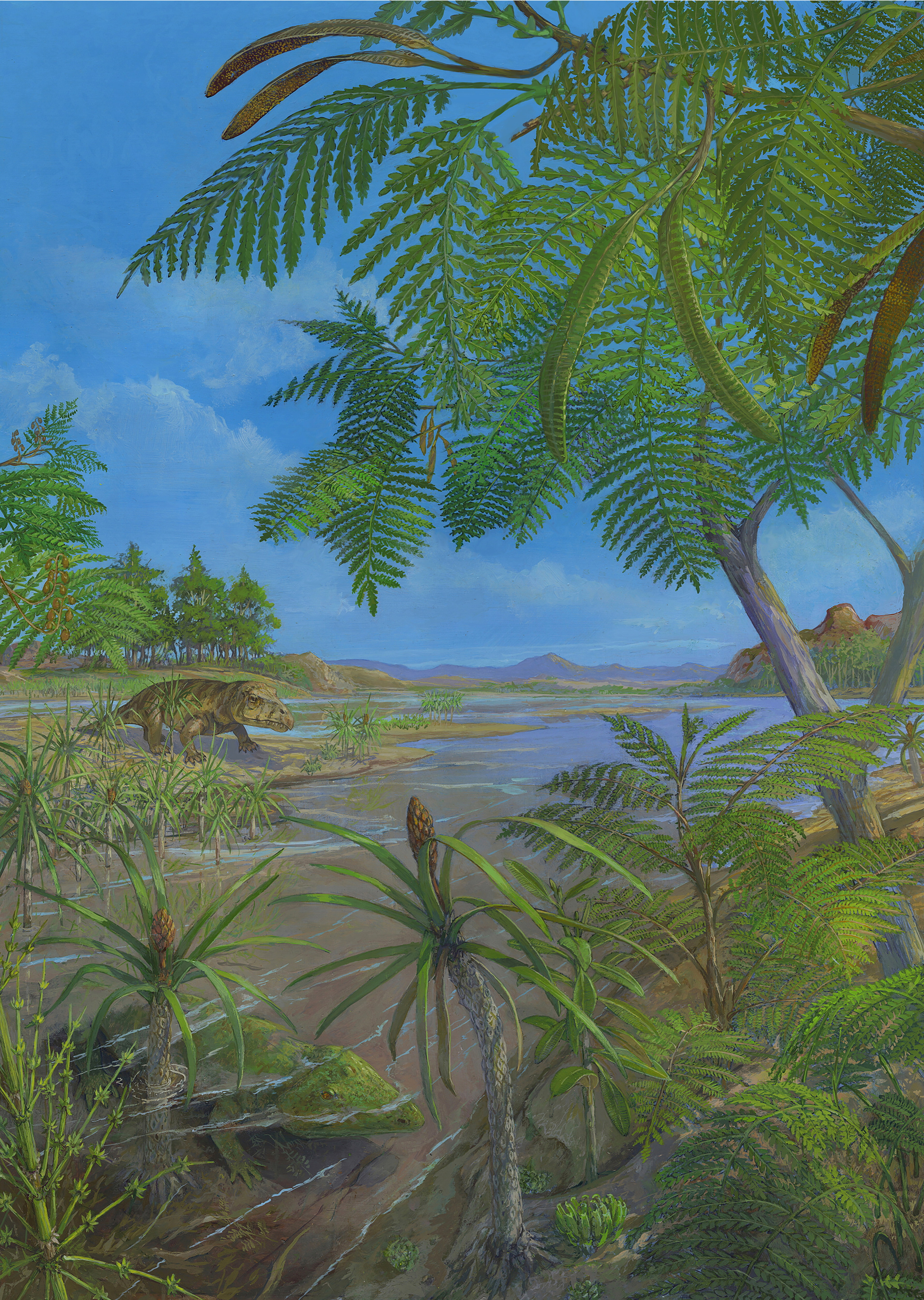
Reconstruction of the Early Triassic Sydney region, characterised by a warm and humid climate.

Sydney's climate history, or the climatic history of the Sydney region, encompasses changes in the climate of Sydney over geological and historical timescales. Palaeoclimatic evidence indicates substantial changes in temperature, precipitation and vegetation in the region, ranging from glacial conditions during the late Palaeozoic to the warmer climates of the Mesozoic and Cenozoic, followed by considerable climatic variability during the Quaternary. Little direct evidence is available for reconstructing the climate of the Sydney region during the Ordovician, Silurian and Devonian, and consequently its climatic conditions during these periods remain poorly constrained.

Written descriptions of Sydney's climate date from the beginning of European settlement in the late 18th century. In 1788, Lieutenant Ralph Clark, a member of the First Fleet, stated that the thunderstorms were the most terrible he has ever experienced. In 1819, Australian explorer William Wentworth described the summer heat as "sometimes excessive" and "oppressive to Europeans", although he noted that sea breezes effectively moderated temperatures and the climate was overall "highly salubrious". In the February 1938 issue of The Home, journalist Basil Burdett wrote, "...Even Melbourne seems like some grey and stately city of Northern Europe compared with Sydney's sub-tropical splendours."

== Palaeoclimate ==
=== Permian glacial climate ===
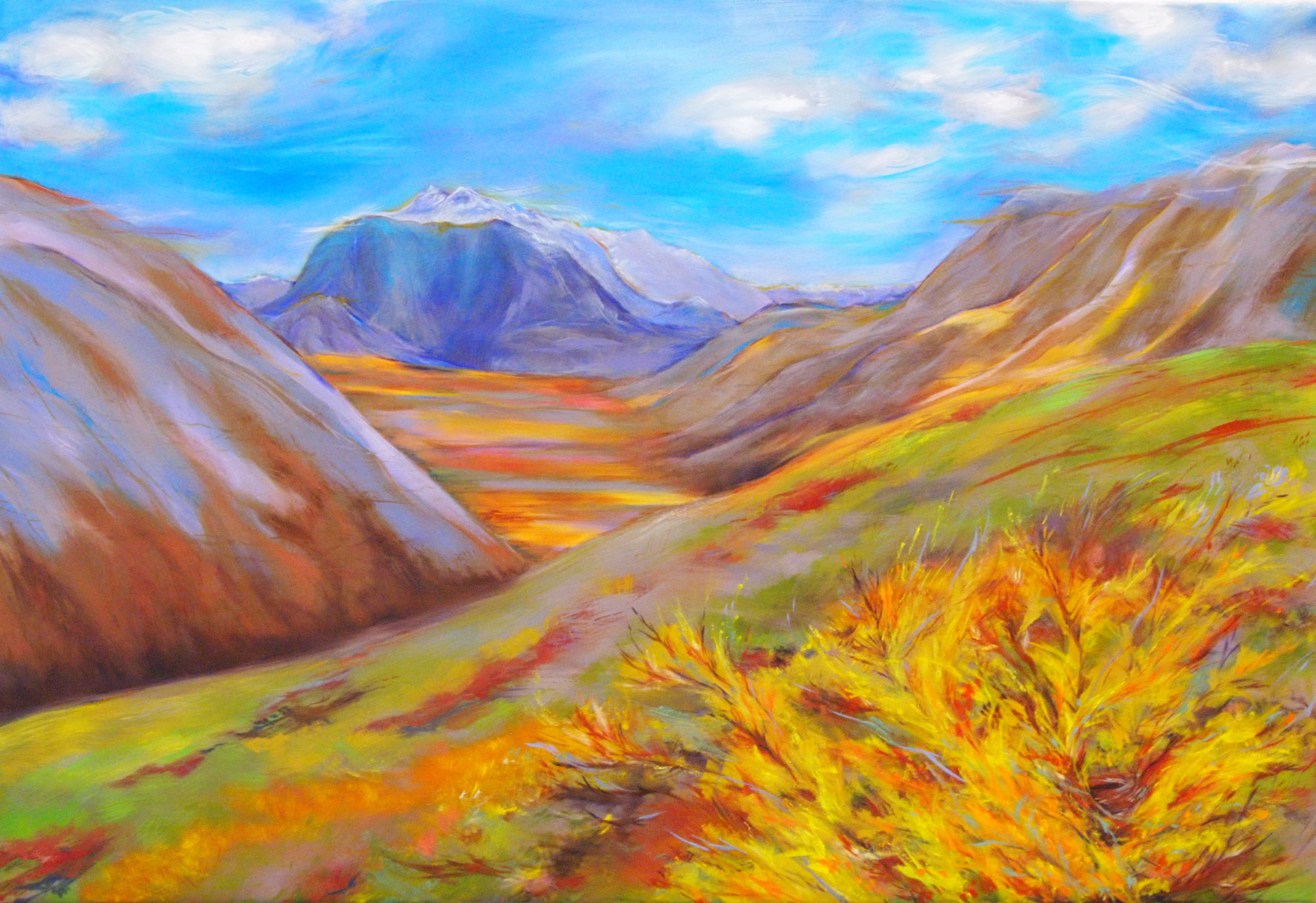
Modern tundra landscape, broadly analogous to vegetation present in the Sydney region during the Late Carboniferous.

During the Late Carboniferous and Early Permian, the Sydney region experienced a cold, high-latitude climate associated with the Late Paleozoic Ice Age. Fossil vegetation evidence indicates that tundra-like vegetation initially colonised the region before milder conditions allowed forests to expand. The Sydney Basin was located at a palaeolatitude of around 60°S to 70°S during the Early and Middle Permian, and its sedimentary successions preserve at least four phases of glaciation throughout this time.

The Sydney Basin preserves evidence of glacial influence, including glacial outwash, dropstones, ice-keel scours and glendonites. Ice-keel scours indicate the seasonal presence of floating ice, while glendonites have been interpreted as evidence of near-freezing marine bottom waters. In the late Early Permian Wandrawandian Siltstone, glendonites represent pseudomorphs after ikaite, a mineral associated with cold marine sediments and temperatures of approximately 0–7 °C. Oxygen-isotope analyses of Permian fossil brachiopod shells indicate predominantly cool marine temperatures of approximately 12–16 °C during the Early and Middle Permian, although some intervals produced warmer estimates. These estimates may have been influenced by changes in seawater composition, including glacial meltwater.

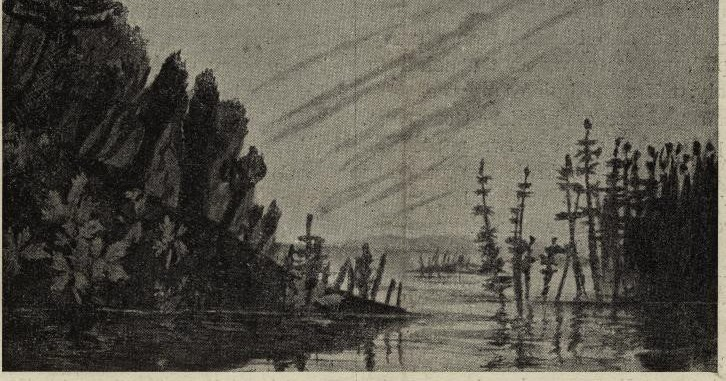
Reconstruction of a Late Permian Glossopteris forest, similar to the cool, wet forests that occurred in the Sydney region.

As the Late Palaeozoic Ice Age waned, the climate became progressively milder. Extensive Glossopteris forests developed during the Late Permian, when humid conditions supported swamp vegetation and the accumulation of coal. Palaeosols associated with the uppermost Permian coal measures indicate cold-temperate wetlands, with some characteristics comparable to modern high-latitude peatlands. Climate simulations for the Sydney Basin immediately before the Permian–Triassic extinction event, approximately 252 million years ago, indicate a strongly seasonal continental climate, with warm, wet summers and cold, comparatively dry winters. The modelled summer–winter temperature difference was approximately 20 to 24 °C (36 to 43 °F), with standard simulations indicating mean winter temperatures below freezing during the coldest part of the season.

=== Early Triassic warming ===
The Early Triassic was substantially warmer than the preceding Permian glacial interval. Climate modelling indicates warmer and wetter conditions in the Sydney Basin, particularly during winter, while local palaeosols record increased chemical weathering. Some palaeosols indicate mean annual temperatures of at least approximately 11 °C and annual precipitation exceeding 1,100 mm.

The climate was nevertheless variable. Five successive episodes of elevated atmospheric carbon dioxide and intensified chemical weathering have been identified in the Sydney Basin, representing transient greenhouse episodes separated by relatively cooler and drier intervals. Estimates from palaeosol chemistry suggest annual precipitation of approximately 1,000–1,300 mm around the Permian–Triassic boundary, declining to approximately 800–1,200 mm during deposition of the lower Narrabeen Group. Sedimentary and palaeobotanical evidence also indicates increasing seasonality and periods of moisture deficiency, although conditions did not become fully arid.

Vegetation also changed substantially following the extinction event, with the disappearance of Glossopteris forests and the increasing prominence of small-leaved evergreen plants. Palaeosols indicate the subsequent development of forests, heaths and coastal wetlands as vegetation recovered through the Triassic. Later Triassic plant assemblages indicate that the Sydney region remained generally humid and temperate, although climatic conditions varied through the period.

=== Quaternary climatic fluctuations ===
Around 17 million years ago, Sydney lay at a palaeolatitude of approximately 45–50°S. Lateritic and Ultisol-type palaeosols identified around the Sydney region, including at Long Reef Beach, indicate substantial chemical weathering under the Miocene climate. Palaeoclimatic records from the Sydney Basin indicate substantial climate variability during the late Pleistocene. Conditions were relatively dry around the Last Glacial Maximum and continued to be dry during parts of the late Pleistocene, including the Antarctic Cold Reversal. Conditions generally became wetter from approximately 14,500 years ago, although this trend was interrupted by renewed dry phases.

Modern swamp vegetation in Sydney, illustrating a wetland environment associated with the region's Quaternary climate.

The early Holocene was generally drier than the later Holocene in the Sydney region. Cooler conditions and increased moisture availability occurred between approximately 9,000 and 7,600 years ago, followed by an abrupt climatic transition around 7,500 years ago. Particularly high moisture availability persisted until approximately 6,200 years ago, after which conditions increasingly approached those of the later Holocene.

The late Holocene was characterised by considerable climatic variability. Research on fire activity in the Sydney Basin has identified changes in fire regimes during the mid-Holocene, potentially associated with the development of the modern El Niño–Southern Oscillation-dominated climate regime and greater variability between wet and dry conditions. The period between approximately 4,000 and 2,000 years ago appears to have been relatively dry, followed by a general shift towards wetter conditions during the last two millennia.

=== Aboriginal seasonal knowledge ===
The Dharawal recognise six seasons:

- January–March (Burran): Hot and dry
- April–June (Marrai'gang): Wet, becoming cooler
- June–late July (Burrugin): Cold, frosty and characterised by short days
- August (Wiritjiribin): Cold and windy
- September–October (Ngoonungi): Cool, becoming warmer
- November–December (Parra'dowee): Warm and wet

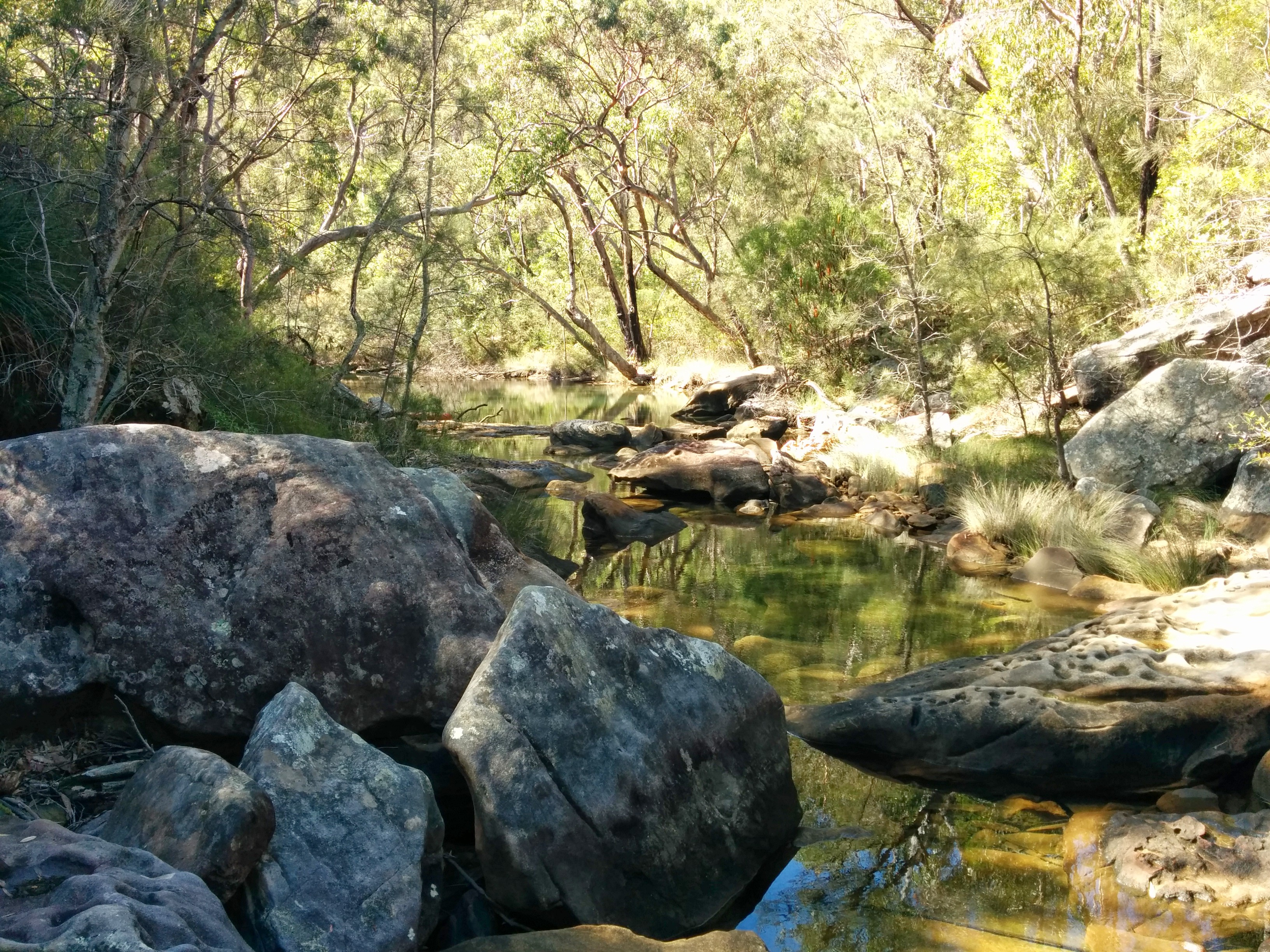
Bushland and a creek in Royal National Park, within traditional Dharawal Country, where seasonal changes are recognised through climatic and ecological indicators.

The Sydney Basin lies within the traditional lands of several Aboriginal Australian peoples. Dharawal seasonal knowledge traditionally recognised changes in weather through observations of the surrounding environment, including the flowering and fruiting of plants, the behaviour and breeding cycles of animals, and changes in temperature, rainfall and wind. Rather than corresponding solely to fixed calendar dates, these environmental indicators signalled the progression of the annual seasonal cycle and informed activities such as food gathering, movement, ceremonies and the use of fire.

The seasons were associated with particular ecological and meteorological indicators. During Burran, the flowering of weetjellan (lightwood) indicated an increased likelihood of violent storms and heavy rainfall and consequently warned against camping near rivers and creeks. The hot conditions also affected customary practices, with the eating of meat avoided during this period because it spoiled rapidly in the heat. During Marrai'gang, the mating calls of quolls and the ripening of lilly pilly fruit accompanied the transition to cooler and wetter conditions. The falling of the fruit signalled the time to prepare warm cloaks and begin movement towards coastal areas.

The coldest part of the annual cycle, Burrugin, was associated with frosty conditions and shorter days, as well as the mating behaviour of echidnas and flowering of forest red gums. Wiritjiribin followed in August, when cold and windy weather was accompanied by gentler spring rains; the flowering of gossamer wattle and the activity of lyrebirds were among its seasonal indicators. During Ngoonungi, temperatures began to rise and large numbers of flying foxes appeared over the Sydney region around sunset. The flowering of the New South Wales waratah also marked this period, which was an important ceremonial season. Parra'dowee marked the return of warm and wet conditions and generally more stable weather. It was associated with the downstream migration of eels towards the ocean and the flowering of coast myall, which indicated the presence of fish in bays and estuaries.

== Historical climate observations ==
=== First Fleet observations, 1788 ===
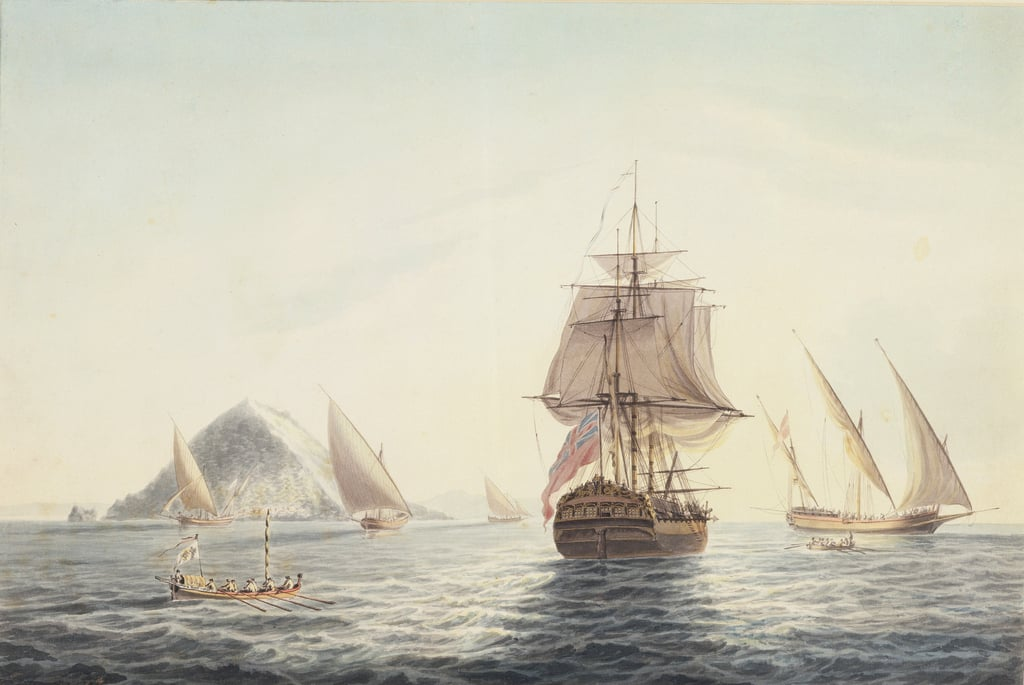
HMS Sirius, aboard which William Bradley recorded meteorological observations in Port Jackson in 1788.

Some of Australia's earliest systematic meteorological observations were made at Sydney following European settlement. William Bradley recorded daily noon temperatures aboard HMS Sirius while it was anchored in Botany Bay and Port Jackson, providing an instrumental temperature record from 20 January to 13 September 1788. His thermometer was kept in the captain's cabin aboard the ship. From 14 September 1788 until December 1791, William Dawes maintained a detailed meteorological journal at his observatory at Dawes Point weather conditions several times each day. Bradley's and Dawes's measurements, supplemented by contemporary documentary accounts, have subsequently been used to reconstruct weather conditions at Sydney Cove during the first years of European settlement.

Bradley's observations indicate that the First Fleet encountered generally warm conditions on its arrival. During its week in Botany Bay in January, contemporary observations recorded temperatures generally in the mid-20s °C, although a strong southerly change accompanied by thick and rainy weather lowered the temperature to approximately 17.2 °C (63.0 °F). Bradley's noon temperatures subsequently averaged 22.8 °C (73.0 °F) in February, 20.8 °C (69.4 °F) in March and 18.3 °C (64.9 °F) in April.

Temperatures continued to decline into the settlement's first winter. Bradley's mean noon temperature was approximately 14.0 °C (57.2 °F) in June and 13.4 °C (56.1 °F) in July, before increasing to 15.2 °C (59.4 °F) in August. Conditions warmed rapidly during spring: reconstructed monthly mean temperatures were approximately 16.9 °C (62.4 °F) in September, 18.4 °C (65.1 °F) in October and 20.5 °C (68.9 °F) in November, while the mean December temperature reached approximately 23.1 °C (73.6 °F). Mean daily maximum temperatures increased from about 20.0 °C (68.0 °F) in September to 27.6 °C (81.7 °F) in December. The measurements should nevertheless be interpreted cautiously because the early part of the record was taken aboard Sirius, while Dawes's later observations were made on land, and the exposure of the early thermometers differed from modern meteorological standards.

Governor Arthur Phillip described the climate of Sydney Cove as generally favourable, comparing it with some of the better climates of Europe. He observed that periods of rain were generally of short duration and that fog was uncommon. First Fleet surgeon George Bouchier Worgan remarked on rapid transitions from dry, sultry heat to squalls, rain, thunder and lightning, together with substantial falls in temperature over the course of a day. Although he characterised the winter as generally clear, pleasant and moderately warm, he also recorded periods of cold, damp and rainy weather.

The first winter of the settlement was notably wet. David Collins reported that persistent heavy rain in August 1788 repeatedly disrupted work at Sydney Cove, damaged the settlement's brick kiln, rendered roads impassable and damaged several huts. Such rainfall was particularly consequential for the newly established settlement because buildings, roads and drainage were rudimentary and much work was being undertaken outdoors. Thunderstorms were also conspicuous during the first year. On 6 February 1788, Ralph Clark recorded an exceptionally intense storm over Sydney Cove, accompanied by extremely heavy rain and almost continuous lightning.

Worgan similarly described abrupt episodes in which hot and oppressive conditions were followed by squalls, thunder, lightning and heavy rain, illustrating the rapid weather changes experienced during Sydney's warm season. These early accounts indicate that the settlers encountered many features characteristic of Sydney's modern climate during their first year, including warm to hot summer weather, abrupt southerly changes, convective thunderstorms, periods of heavy rainfall and comparatively mild but changeable winters.

=== Tench's climate observations, 1791 ===
In 1791, Lieutenant General Watkin Tench stated that Sydney's climate was warm enough to sustain plant life all year round: "Nor will this surprise, if the genial influence of the climate be considered. Placed in a latitude where the beams of the sun in the dreariest season are sufficiently powerful for many hours of the day to dispense warmth and nutrition, the progress of vegetation never is at a stand." On 18 July that year, Tench described a particularly cold morning for Sydney's standards, near a waterbody that was most likely to be Prospect Creek. (Note: The freezing event likely occurred in the area of Prospect Reservoir, approximately 10 km southwest of Parramatta, and it is possible that similar conditions may have occurred near Lansdowne Bridge in Carramar.)

Tench carried a thermometer in the area to record the unusually cool temperatures, in which he stated that "a degree of cold for the latitude of the place that I think myself bound to transcribe it." Such cold mornings can be attributed to The Little Ice Age, which extended from the 16th to the 19th centuries, and would have affected south-east Australia's climate in the late 18th century, which was at the time when Europeans first colonized Australia. On his diary entry regarding the cold conditions, Tench wrote:

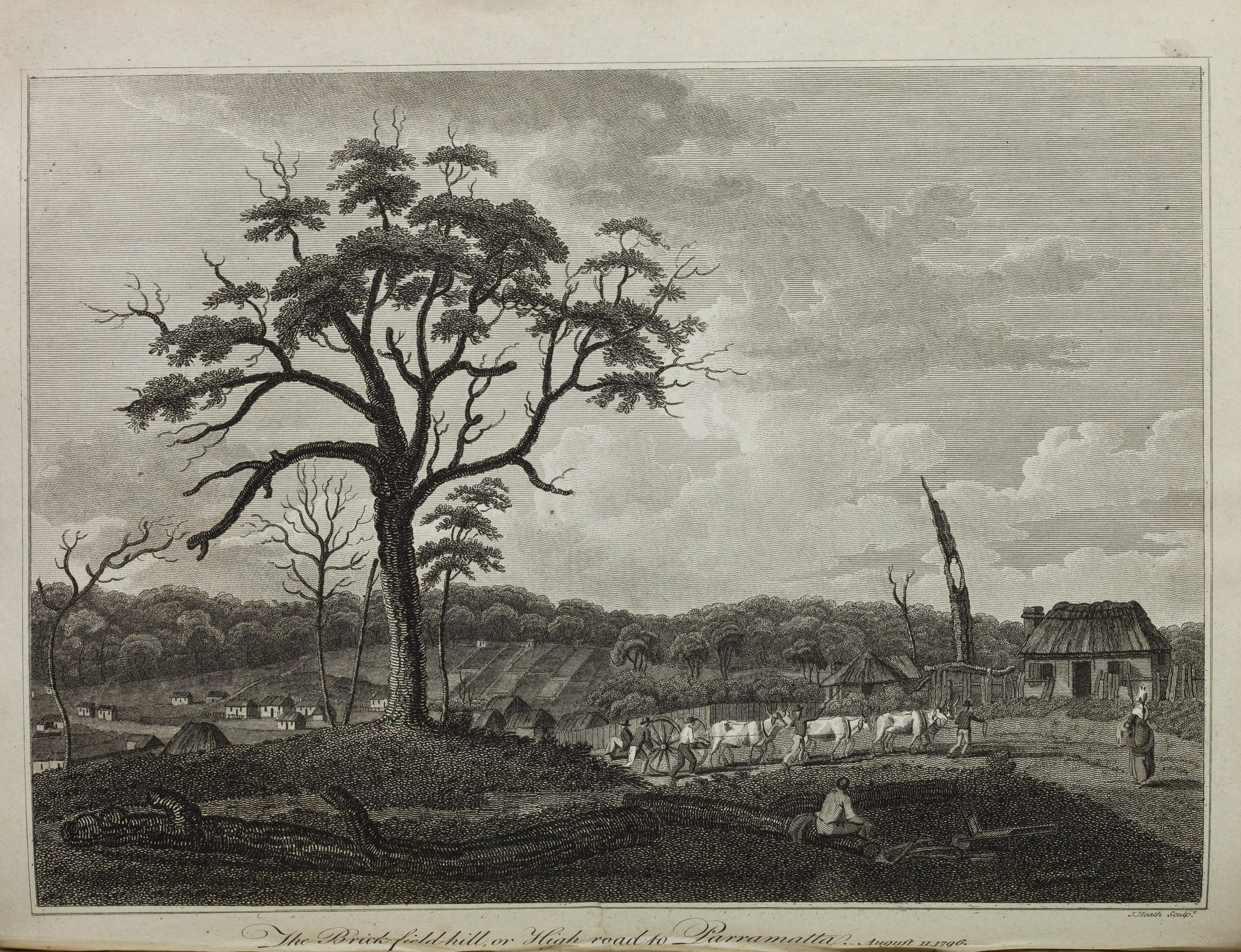
Early view of Parramatta, then known as Rose Hill, where Watkin Tench described severe winter frosts and greater temperature extremes than at coastal Sydney in 1791.

The sun arose in unclouded splendor and presented to our sight a novel and picturesque view. The contiguous country as white as if covered with snow, contrasted with the foliage of trees flourishing in the verdure of tropical luxuriancy. Even the exhalation which steamed from the lake beneath contributed to heighten the beauty of the scene. Wind SSW. Thermormeter at sunrise 25 °F (−4 °C). The following night was still colder. At sunset the thermometer stood at 45 °F (7 °C); at a quarter before four in the morning, it was at 26 °F (−3 °C); at a quarter before six at 24 °F (−4 °C); at a quarter before seven, at 23 °F (−5 °C); at seven o'clock, 22.7 °F (−5.2 °C); at sunrise, 23 °F (−5 °C), after which it continued gradually to mount, and between one and two o'clock, stood at 59.6 °F (15.3 °C) in the shade. Wind SSW. The horizon perfectly clear all day, not the smallest speck to be seen. Nothing but demonstration could have convinced me that so severe a degree of cold ever existed in this low latitude. Drops of water on a tin pot, not altogether out of the influence of the fire, were frozen into solid ice in less than twelve minutes. Part of a leg of kangaroo which we had roasted for supper was frozen quite hard, all the juices of it being converted into ice. On those ponds which were near the surface of the earth, the covering of ice was very thick; but on those which were lower down it was found to be less so, in proportion to their depression; and wherever the water was 12 ft (3.7 m) below the surface (which happened to be the case close to us) it was uncongealed. It remains to be observed that the cold of both these nights, at Rose Hill and Sydney, was judged to be greater than had ever before been felt.

— Watkin Tench, A Complete Account of the Settlement at Port Jackson

In December 1791, Tench described the difference between the climate of Sydney CBD and inland areas such as Parramatta, which included the microclimate, the diurnal range, and as well as a record of snowflakes:

The different temperatures of Rose Hill and Sydney in winter, though only 12 miles (19.3 km) apart, afford, however, curious matter of speculation. Of a well attested instance of ice being seen at the latter place, I never heard. At the former place its production is common, and once a few flakes of snow fell. The difference can be accounted for only by supposing that the woods stop the warm vapours of the sea from reaching Rose Hill, which is at the distance of 16 miles (25.7 km) inland; whereas Sydney is but four. Again, the heats of summer are more violent at the former place than at the latter, and the variations incomparably quicker. The thermometer has been known to alter at Rose Hill, in the course of nine hours, more than 50 °F (28 °C); standing a little before sunrise at 50 °F (10 °C), and between one and two at more than 100 °F (38 °C).

— Watkin Tench, A Complete Account of the Settlement at Port Jackson

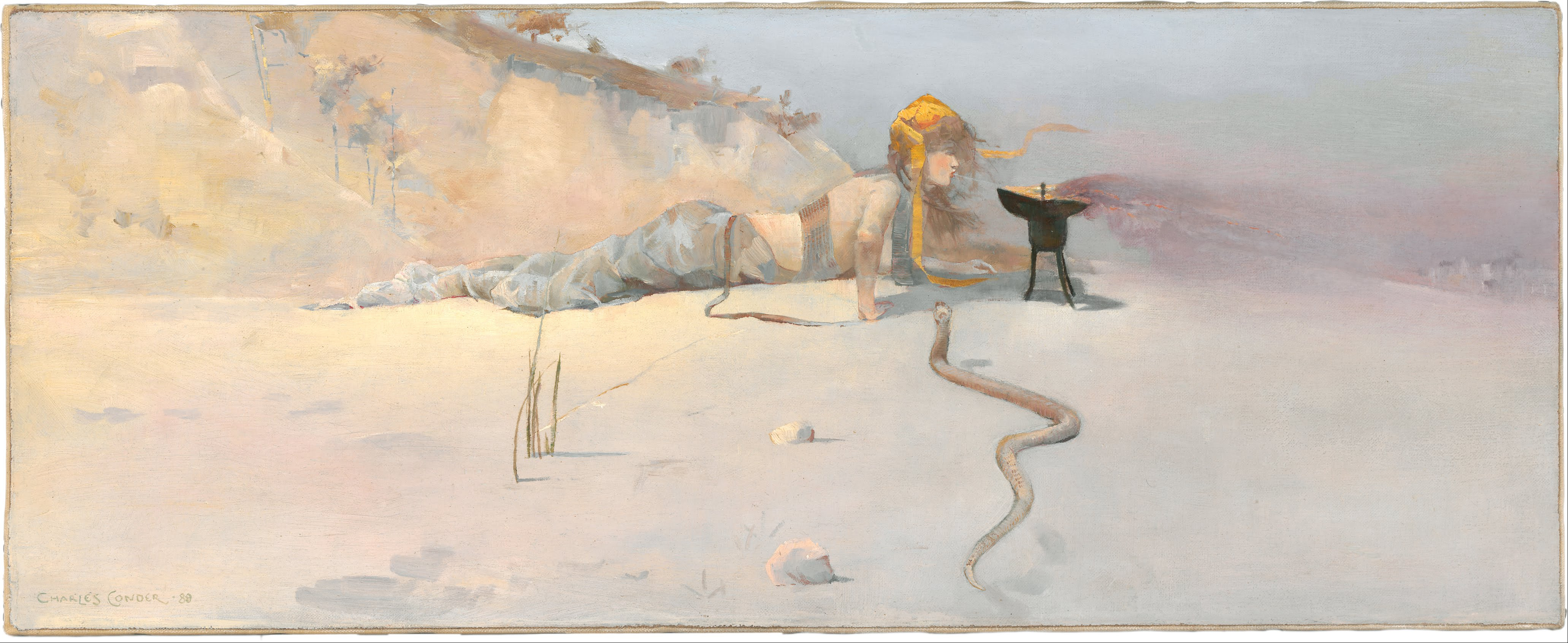
Hot Wind (1889) by Charles Conder, illustrating the hot, dry conditions associated with north-westerly winds described by Watkin Tench in early Sydney.

In 1791–92, Tench described the summers as uncomfortably hot, where settlers felt "A temporary sickness at the stomach, accompanied with lassitude and headache". The heat was reported to be "occasioned by the wind blowing over immense deserts...in a north-west direction from Port Jackson". The heat attested in that summer was so intense that it killed bats and parrots in the area.

But even this heat was judged to be far exceeded in the latter end of the following February, when the north-west wind again set in, and blew with great violence for three days...Clouds, storms and sunshine pass in rapid succession. Of rain, we found in general not a sufficiency, but torrents of water sometimes fall. Thunder storms, in summer, are common and very tremendous, but they have ceased to alarm, from rarely causing mischief. Sometimes they happen in winter. I have often seen large hailstones fall. Frequent strong breezes from the westward purge the air. These are almost invariably attended with a hard clear sky. The easterly winds, by setting in from the sea, bring thick weather and rain, except in summer, when they become regular sea-breezes. The 'aurora australis' is sometimes seen, but is not distinguished by superior brilliancy.

— Watkin Tench, A Complete Account of the Settlement at Port Jackson

=== Early 19th century observations ===
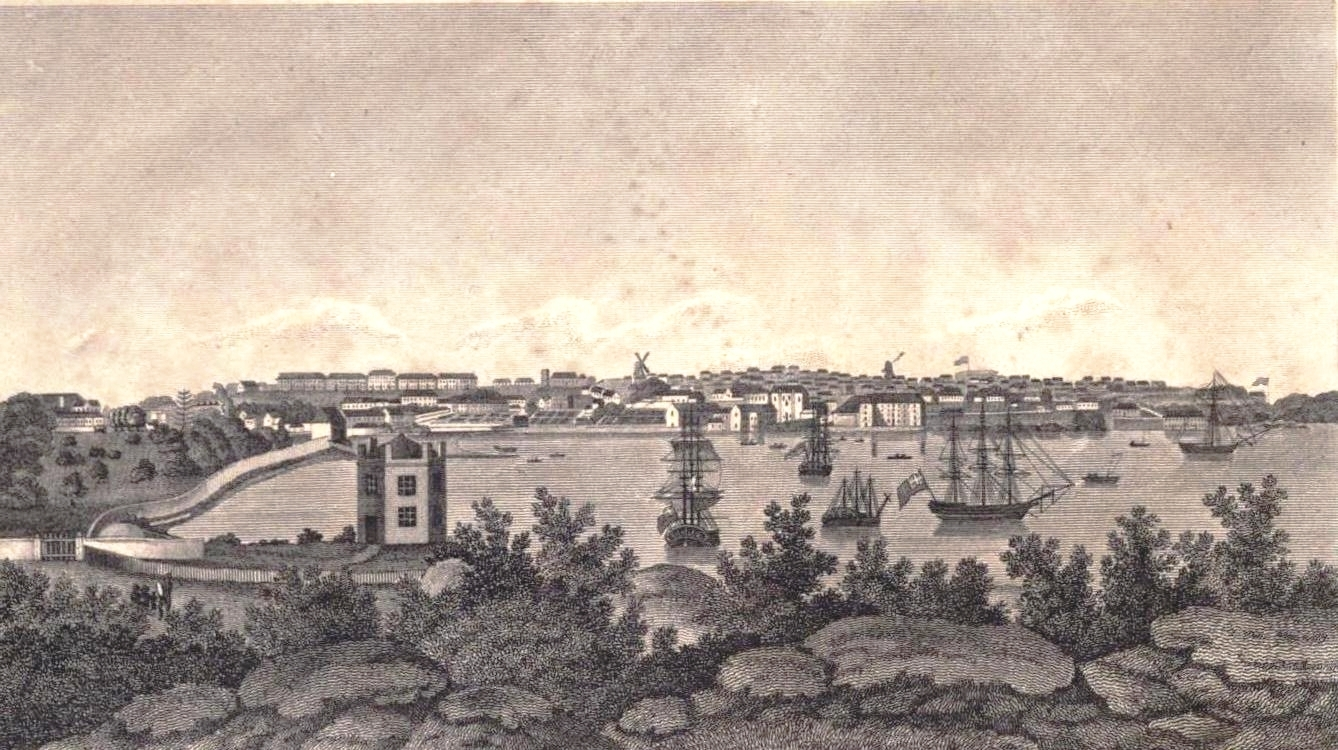
Sydney Cove around 1820, when Sydney's summer heat was noted to be moderated by regular sea breezes.

In February 1803, naturalist George Caley, based at Parramatta, recorded extreme summer heat. On 4 February, he observed a temperature of 105 °F (40.6 °C) in the shade at 2:30 pm despite a "stiff" south-south-easterly breeze, and remarked that temperatures several days earlier may have been considerably higher. From March 1803, the Sydney Gazette began publishing regular meteorological observations taken at Government House in Sydney, forming one of the earliest surviving systematic instrumental weather records from nineteenth-century Australia. Contemporary tables stated that the instruments were kept "under a shade" at Government House. Because the instruments and their exposure did not conform to later standardised meteorological practice, the observations are not directly equivalent to modern measurements. The surviving readings have subsequently been analysed using modern Sydney observations to estimate daily and monthly maximum and minimum temperatures for the period from March 1804 to April 1805.

In October 1803, the Sydney Gazette reported that hot winds had produced damaging effects at Parramatta, Prospect and other districts surrounding Sydney. The combination of Caley's extreme temperature observation and contemporary reports of hot winds indicates that episodes of intense inland heat and abrupt changes in wind direction were already prominent features of the documented climate of the Sydney region. In late May and early June 1805, George Johnston repeatedly described gloomy and rainy conditions around Sydney. Several successive days were affected by persistent rain, with one episode accompanied by distant thunder. In 1819, British explorer William Wentworth describes Sydney's climate as being pleasant, though he focuses particularly on the summer heat:

The climate of the colony, particularly in the inland districts, is highly salubrious, although the heats in summer are sometimes excessive, the thermometer frequently rising in the shade to 90 °F (32 °C), and even to a 100 °F (38 °C) and upwards of Fahrenheit – This, it must be admitted, is a degree of heat that would be highly oppressive to Europeans, were it not that the sea breeze sets in regularly about nine o'clock in the morning. If the summers are occasionally a little too hot for the European constitution, it will be remembered that the extreme heats which I have noticed as happening during the north-west winds, are of but short continuance; and that the sea and land breezes, which prevail at this season in an almost uninterrupted succession, moderate the temperature so effectually, that even new comers are but little incommoded by it. The hot season, however, which is undoubtedly the most unhealthy part of the year, does not, as will have been perceived, continue above four months. The remaining eight possess a temperature so highly moderate and congenial to the human constitution, that the climate of this colony would upon the whole, appear to justify the glowing enthusiasm of those who have ventured to call it the Montpellier of the world.

— William Wentworth, Statistical, Historical, and Political Description of New South Wales

==== Seasons ====
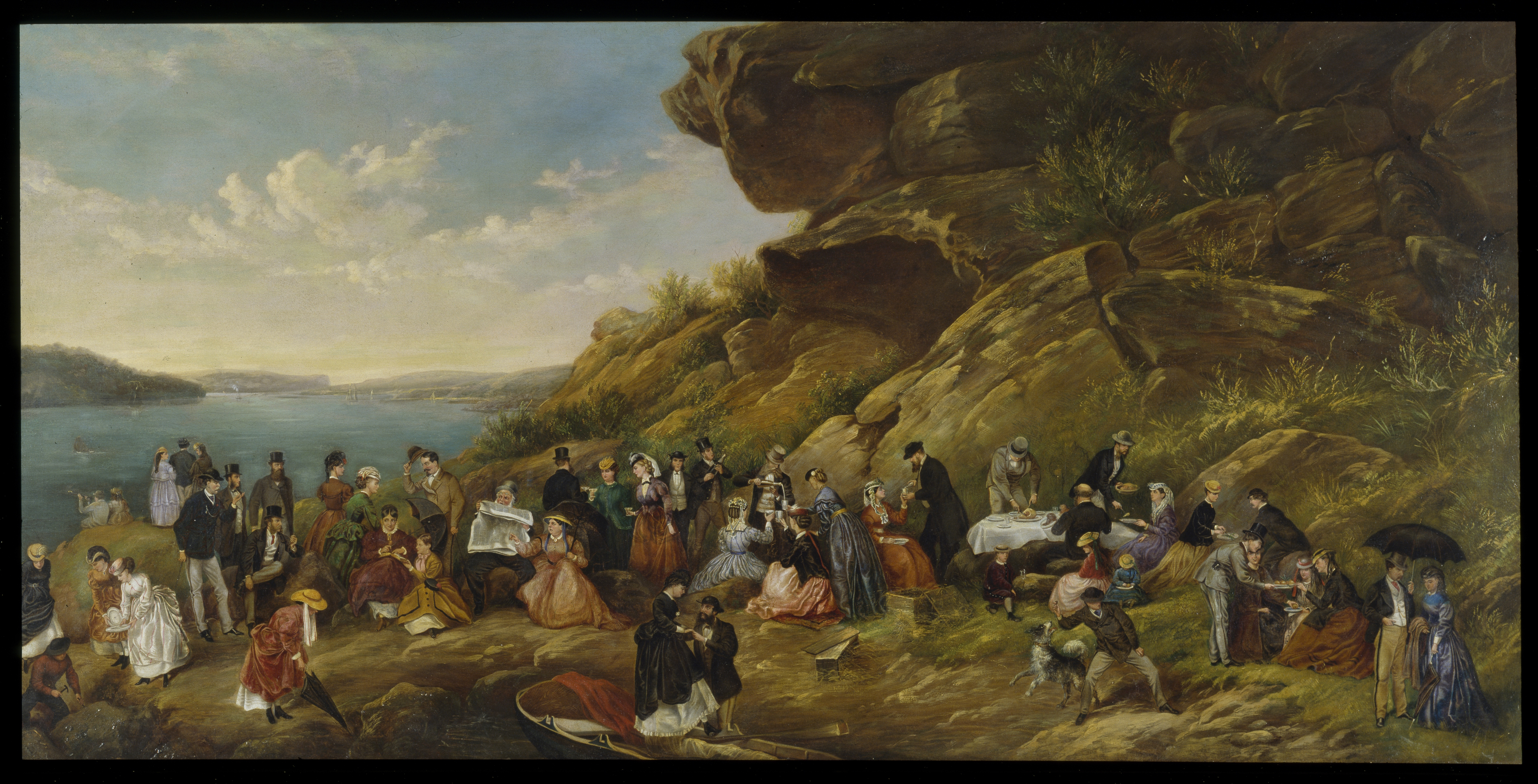
A picnic on Sydney Harbour in 1870. Sydney's generally mild climate permitted outdoor recreation throughout much of the year.

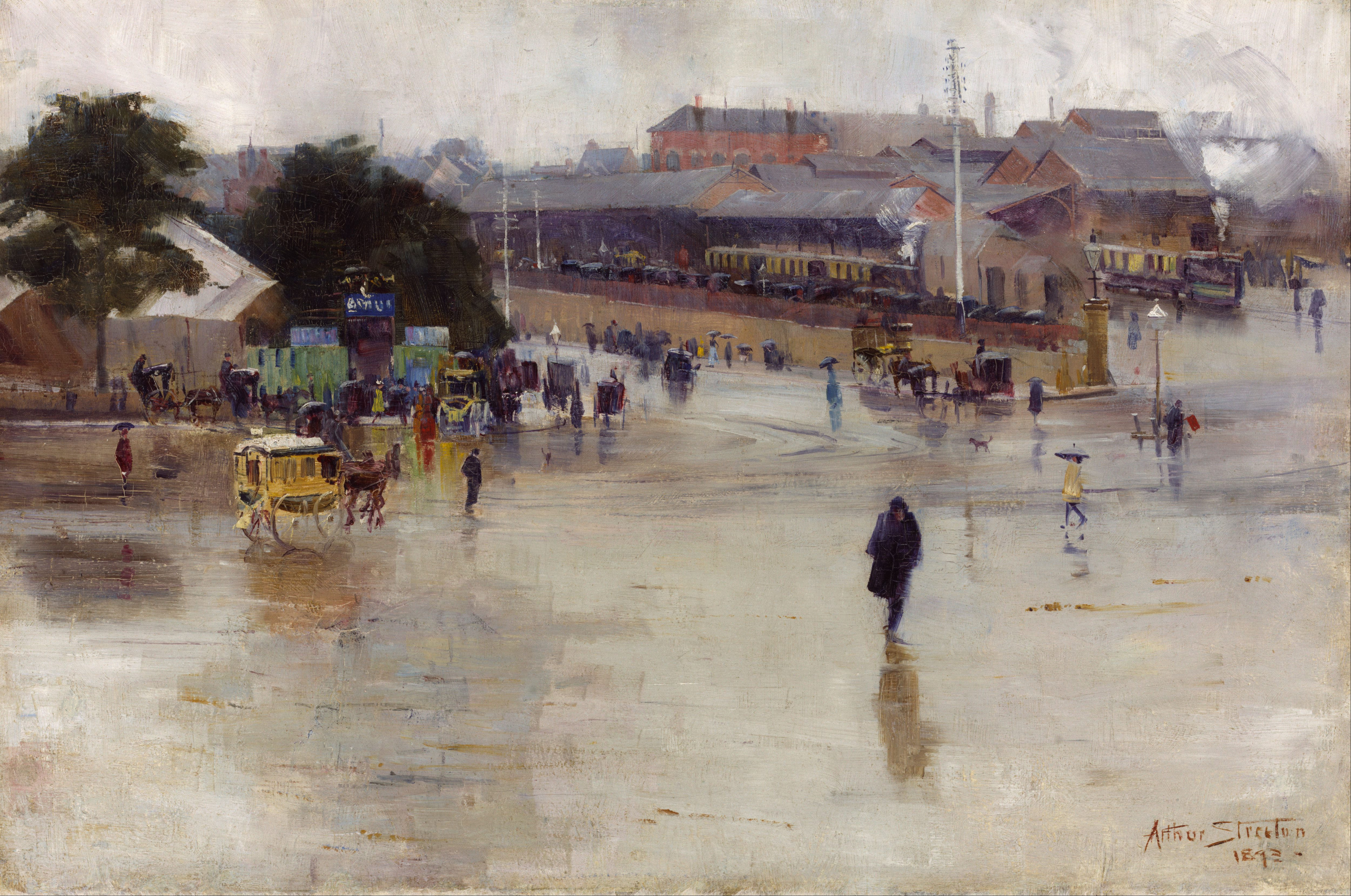
A rainy day in Redfern in 1893. Early observers of Sydney's climate noted that summer thunderstorms could produce periods of heavy rainfall.

In 1819, Wentworth describes Sydney's (Note: Wentworth made these meteorological observations at Liverpool in Greater Western Sydney, where the inland climate is characterised by hotter summer days and cooler winter nights than coastal Sydney.) seasonal and annual weather patterns in analytical detail:

Summer

During these three months violent storms of thunder and lightning are very frequent, and the heavy falls of rain which take place on these occasions, tend considerably to refresh the country, of which the verdure in all but low moist situations entirely disappears. At this season the most unpleasant part of the day is the interval which elapses between the cessation of the land breeze and the setting in of the sea. This happens generally between six and eight o'clock in the morning, when the thermometer is upon an average at about 72 °F (22 °C). During this interval the sea is as smooth as glass, and not a zephyr is found to disport even among the topmost boughs of the loftiest trees.

Autumn

The weather in March is generally very unsettled. This month, in fact, may be considered the rainy season, and has been more fertile in floods than any other of the year. The thermometer varies during the day about 12 °C, being at day-light as low as from 55 to 60 °F (13 to 16 °C), and at noon as high as from 70 to 75 °F (21 to 24 °C). The sea and land breezes at this time become very feeble, although they occasionally prevail during the whole year. The usual winds from the end of March to the beginning of September, are from S. to S. W.

The weather in the commencement of April is frequently showery, but towards the middle it gradually becomes more settled, and towards the conclusion perfectly clear and serene. The thermometer at the beginning of the month varies from 72 to 74 °F (22 to 23 °C) at noon, and from the middle to the end gradually declines to 66 °F (19 °C) and sometimes to 60 °F (16 °C). In the mornings it is as low as 52 °F (11 °C), and fires become in consequence general throughout the colony. The weather in the month of May is truly delightful. The atmosphere is perfectly cloudless, and the mornings and evenings become with the advance of the month more chilly, and render a good fire a highly comfortable and cheering guest. Even during the middle of the day the most violent exercise may be taken without inconvenience. The thermometer at sun-rise is under 50 °F (10 °C), and seldom above 60 °F (16 °C) at noon.

Winter

The three winter months are June, July, and August. During this interval the mornings and evenings are very chilly, and the nights excessively cold. Hoar frosts are frequent, and become more severe the further you advance into the interior. Ice 0.5 inches (1.3 cm) thick is found at the distance of 20 mi (32 km) from the coast. Very little rain falls at this season, but the dews are very heavy when it does not freeze, and tend considerably to preserve the young crops from the effects of drought. Fogs too are frequent and dense in low damp situations, and on the banks of the rivers. The mean temperature at day-light is from 40 to 45 °F (4 to 7 °C), and at noon from 55 to 60 °F (13 to 16 °C).

Spring

The spring months are September, October, and November. In the beginning of September the fogs still continue; the nights are cold, but the days clear and pleasant. Towards the close of this month the cold begins very sensibly to moderate. Light showers occasionally prevail, accompanied with thunder and lightning. The thermometer at the beginning of the month is seldom above 60 °F (16 °C) at noon, but towards the end frequently rises to 70 °F (21 °C).

In October there are also occasional showers, but the weather upon the whole is clear and pleasant. The days gradually become warmer, and the blighting north-west winds are to be apprehended. The sea and land breezes again resume their full sway. The thermometer at sun-rise varies from 60 to 65 °F (16 to 18 °C), and at noon is frequently up to 80 °F (27 °C).

In November the weather may be again called hot. Dry parching winds prevail as the month advances, and squalls of thunder and lightning with rain or hail. The thermometer at day-light is seldom under 65 °F (18 °C), and frequently at noon rises to 80 °F (27 °C), 84 °F (29 °C), and even 90 °F (32 °C).

— William Wentworth, Statistical, Historical, and Political Description of NSW

=== 19th century climate variability ===
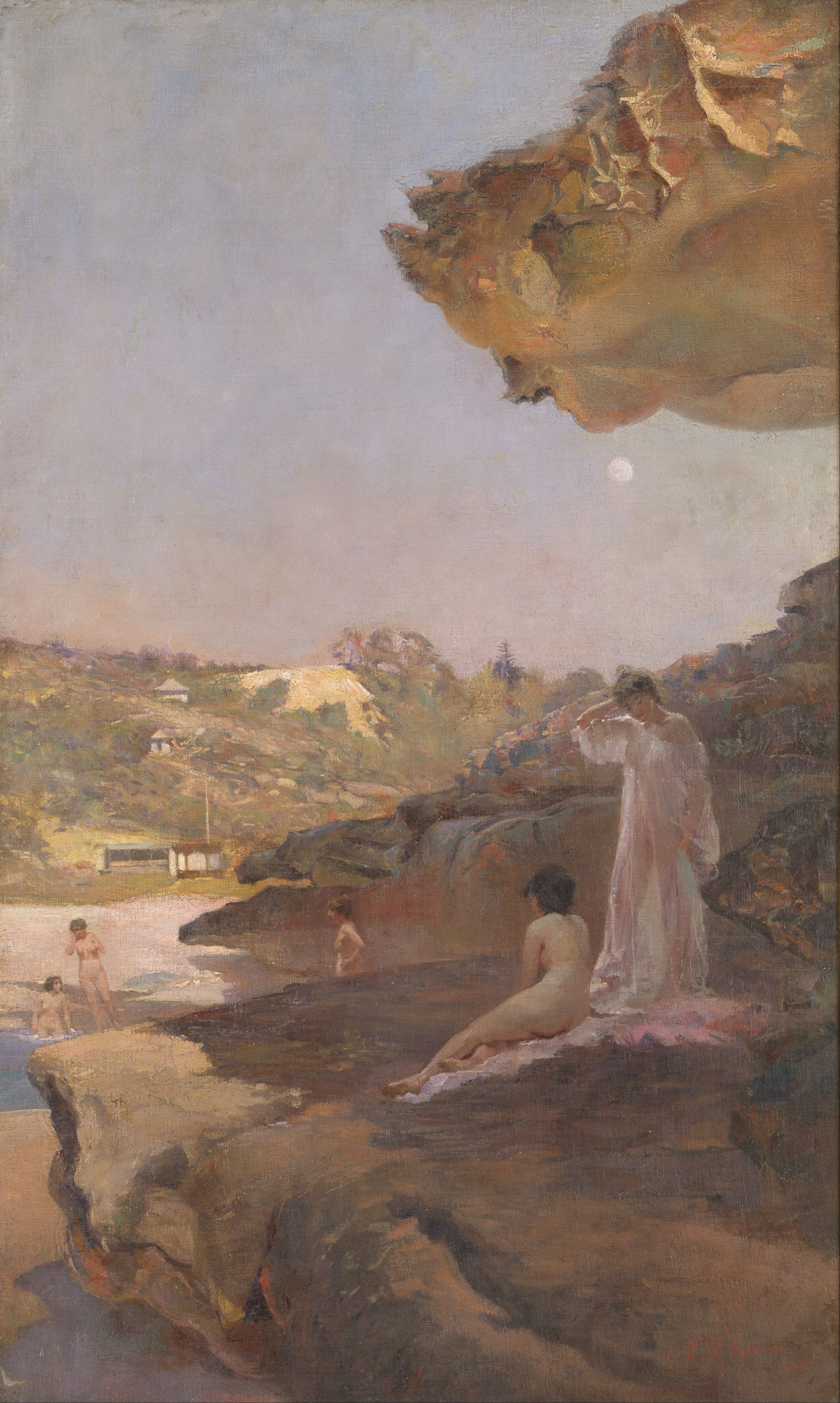
Bathing at Tamarama Beach during the late 19th century. Settlers commonly sought relief from Sydney's intense summer heat by bathing.

Historical climate reconstructions indicate that 1826–1829 was characterised by generally above-average temperatures, with 1829 particularly warm, while contemporary accounts described severe drought across the colony. William Henry Breton described the drought of 1826–1829 as the "Great Drought", reporting that many settlers were nearly ruined and that thousands of cattle perished. He stated that in one part of the colony no rain fell for six months and thirteen days, while another received only a few light showers over eight months.

In 1830, the Agricultural and Horticultural Society of New South Wales described the preceding drought as lasting approximately three and a half years and reported that it had killed forest trees and caused extensive cracking of the ground. The drought ended with a pronounced shift towards wetter conditions, with heavy rainfall and flooding reported during 1830 and 1831. In comparing Sydney with Illawarra, Breton attributed Illawarra's milder climate partly to its escarpment shielding the district from the hot winds experienced around Sydney and to the moderating influence of cool sea breezes. A pronounced cooling occurred during the mid-1830s, followed by generally dry conditions between 1837 and 1842.

On 28 June 1836, newspapers reported an exceptional fall of snow in Sydney. The Sydney Herald described the streets as being covered to a depth of nearly 1 inch (2.5 cm), while a meteorological table recorded a temperature of 38 °F (3.3 °C) that morning. Contemporary newspapers claimed that it was the first snowfall observed in Sydney since European settlement. The event reportedly disrupted trade by preventing some sellers from transporting goods to market. The identification of the precipitation as snow has subsequently been questioned, with the Bureau of Meteorology suggesting that it may instead have been graupel, or soft hail. T. A. Browne, who kept weather observations during the period, later recalled the event:

The years 1836, 1837 and 1838 were years of drought, and in one of these years (1836) a remarkable thing happened. There was a fall of snow; we made snowballs at Enmore and enjoyed the usual schoolboy amusements therewith.

The Sydney Monitor similarly remarked on the apparent rarity of the event:

We believe snow was never seen in Sydney before the previous night. The weather was cold, but not more so than we have often felt it before.

The Sydney Morning Herald also reported on the event:

For the first time in the memory of the oldest inhabitants, snow fell in Sydney on the morning of Tuesday last. 27 June 1836, about 7 o'clock in the morning, a drifting fall covered the streets nearly one inch in depth...A razor-keen wind from the west blew pretty strongly at the time and altogether, it was the most English like winter morning ever experienced.

In 1842, Ludwig Leichhardt recorded aspects of Sydney's coastal wind regime, observing that south-westerly winds commonly occurred during the morning before easterly and north-easterly sea breezes developed around midday and during the afternoon. He also noted an unusually severe hailstorm reported at Newport in April 1842, which followed several days of weather described as unusually hot for the season. Conditions were cool and wet in 1844, while warmer and drier conditions returned during the mid-1840s. Another relatively cool and dry period occurred around Sydney during the early 1850s. Systematic meteorological observations commenced at Sydney Observatory in 1858, establishing what would become Sydney's principal long-term instrumental climate record.

In June 1867, prolonged heavy rainfall produced catastrophic flooding along the Hawkesbury–Nepean River. The flood remains the highest recorded at Windsor, where contemporary reports described much of the town as inundated and the surrounding country as resembling a vast inland sea. In January 1870, contemporary reports described an exceptionally hot day in Sydney during which a hot westerly wind began shortly after daylight. Outdoor labourers reportedly sought relief by repeatedly soaking handkerchiefs in water and placing them beneath their hats.

The prolonged Federation Drought began during the 1890s. In January 1896, Sydney was affected by an intense heatwave that extended across much of New South Wales. On 13 January, the temperature at Sydney Observatory reached 108.5 °F (42.5 °C), the highest recorded there since observations began in 1859, surpassing the previous record set in January 1863. Contemporary reports described the heatwave as unprecedented in intensity during the approximately 38 years of observations then available from the Observatory. The 9th edition of the Encyclopædia Britannica, published in 1875, compared Sydney's mean annual temperature of 62.4°F (16.9°C) with that of Lisbon, Portugal.

=== Early to mid-20th century ===
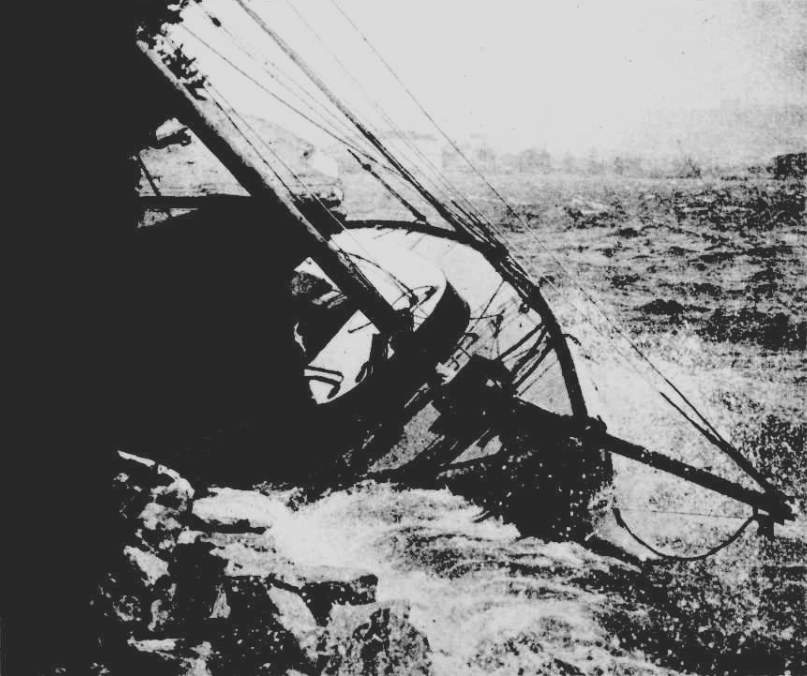
The yacht Alice wrecked at Rose Bay during a severe gale that struck Sydney in December 1938.

The early 20th century began during the closing stages of the Federation Drought, which reached exceptional severity across much of New South Wales in 1902 before more widespread rainfall returned during 1903. Contemporary accounts described the drought as among the most severe experienced in the colony since the early 19th century. Rainfall in Sydney remained highly variable during the following decade. At Sydney Observatory, annual rainfall totalled 808.7 mm (31.84 in) in 1906 and 794.5 mm (31.28 in) in 1907, compared with 1,158.7 mm (45.62 in) in 1908 and 1,193.6 mm (46.99 in) in 1910. Large variations also occurred between individual months; July rainfall increased from only 8.6 mm (0.34 in) in 1907 to 294.1 mm (11.58 in) in 1908.

On 13 June 1919, Sydney reached 75.5 °F (24.2 °C), which was reported at the time as a record-high June temperature. In March 1923, a violent thunderstorm crossed the city during a period of drought, producing intense lightning and rainfall. Later that year, a short but severe windstorm struck Five Dock, removing roofs from several buildings and damaging electrical infrastructure. In April 1927, an intense East coast low produced severe weather along the New South Wales coast and caused extensive damage in Sydney. Gale-force winds affected the harbour and Botany Bay, while intense rainfall was recorded at Sydney Observatory during 18–19 April.

On 22 June 1932, the temperature at Sydney Observatory fell to 2.1 °C (35.8 °F), the lowest minimum recorded at the station. Seven years later, an intense heatwave produced the opposite extreme: on 14 January 1939, Observatory Hill reached 45.3 °C (113.5 °F), which remained Sydney's highest recorded temperature until 2013. Severe wind and rainfall events also occurred during the 1940s. On 31 October 1940, a westerly wind gust of 154 km/h (96 mph) was recorded at Observatory Hill. In March 1942, exceptionally heavy rainfall affected the Sydney region, with 383 mm (15.1 in) recorded at Turramurra during the 24 hours to 28 March. The middle of the century was marked by an exceptionally wet period. In 1950, Sydney Observatory recorded 2,194.0 mm (86.38 in) of rainfall, establishing an annual rainfall record that remained unbroken until 2022.

== See also ==
- Climate of Sydney
- Geography of Sydney
- History of Sydney
