= Clinopsalta autumna =

Scientific classification
- Kingdom: Animalia
- Phylum: Arthropoda
- Clade: Pancrustacea
- Class: Insecta
- Order: Hemiptera
- Suborder: Auchenorrhyncha
- Family: Cicadidae
- Genus: Clinopsalta
- Species: C. autumna

Binomial name
- Clinopsalta autumna Popple & Emery, 2017

Species of cicada

Clinopsalta autumna is a species of cicada, also known as the ferny acacia cicada, in the true cicada family, Cicadettinae subfamily and Cicadettini tribe. It is endemic to Australia. It was described in 2017 by Australian entomologists Lindsay Popple and David L. Emery.

== Etymology ==
The species epithet autumna comes from Latin autumnus (autumn), with reference to the colouration of the cicadas matching those of autumn leaves in a deciduous forest.

== Description ==
The length of the forewing is 21–25 mm.

== Distribution and habitat ==
The species occurs in coastal and subcoastal eastern Australia from Bauple, Queensland to Berry, New South Wales. The associated habitat is the middle storey of open forest with wattles, especially Acacia irrorata and Acacia parramattensis, as well as regrowth acacia thickets.

== Behaviour ==
Adults may be heard from early September to January, clinging to the stems of wattles, uttering calls characterised by a rattling introduction followed by a mix of chirping, clicking and wing-snapping.
