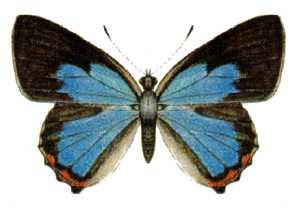

Scientific classification
- Domain: Eukaryota
- Kingdom: Animalia
- Phylum: Arthropoda
- Class: Insecta
- Order: Lepidoptera
- Family: Lycaenidae
- Genus: Hypochrysops
- Species: H. delicia

Binomial name
- Hypochrysops delicia Hewitson, 1875

Synonyms
- Miletus delicia delos Waterhouse & Lyell, 1914; Miletus delicia var. duaringae Waterhouse, 1903; Hypochrysops regina Grose-Smith & Kirby, 1895

= Hypochrysops delicia =

Species of butterfly

Hypochrysops delicia, the moonlight jewel, is a member of the family Lycaenidae. It is found in eastern Australia.

The wingspan is about 40 mm.

The larvae feed on Acacia species, including A. binervia, A. dealbata, A. flavescens, A. implexa, A. irrorata, A. leiocalyx, A. mearnsii, A. melanoxylon, A. parramattensis, A. pycnantha and A. spectabilis. It is usually attended by Crematogaster species.

== Subspecies ==
- H. d. delicia - Hewitson, 1875 (southern Queensland to central New South Wales)
- H. d. delos - Waterhouse & Lyell, 1914 (southern New South Wales to Victoria)
- H. d. duaringae - Waterhouse, 1903 (central Queensland)
- H. d. regina - Grose-Smith & Kirby, 1895 (Moluccas)
