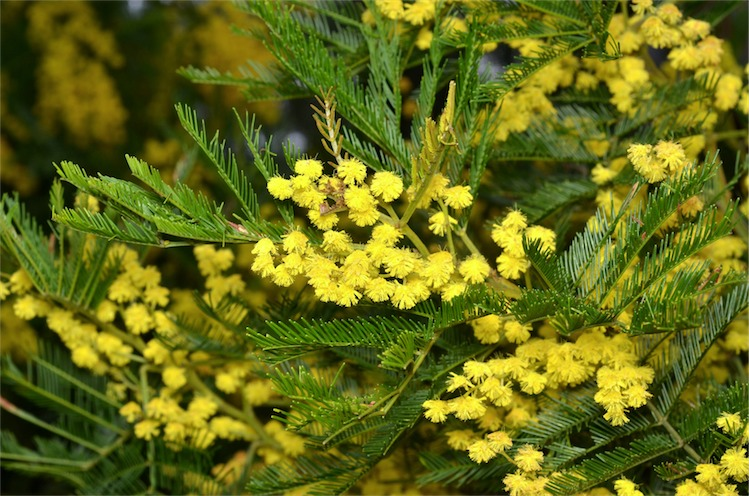

Scientific classification
- Kingdom: Plantae
- Clade: Tracheophytes
- Clade: Angiosperms
- Clade: Eudicots
- Clade: Rosids
- Order: Fabales
- Family: Fabaceae
- Subfamily: Caesalpinioideae
- Clade: Mimosoid clade
- Genus: Acacia
- Species: A. decurrens

Binomial name
- Acacia decurrens Willd.
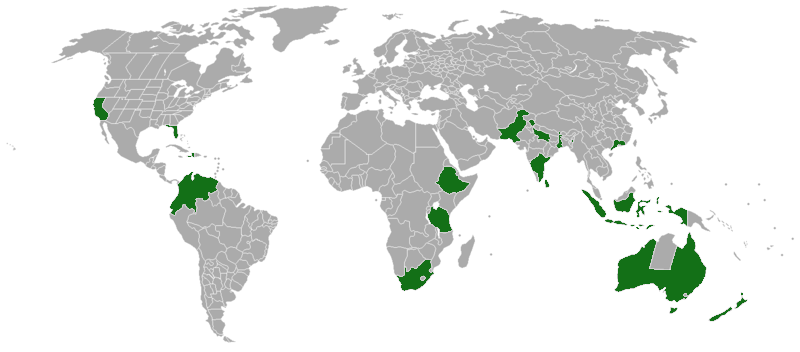
- Occurrence data from AVH

Synonyms
- List: Acacia angulata Desv.; Acacia decurrens Willd. f. decurrens; Acacia decurrens var. angulata (Desv.) Benth.; Acacia decurrens Willd. var. decurrens; Acacia decurrens var. normalis Benth. nom. inval.; Acacia decurrens var. normalis Maiden nom. inval.; Acacia decurrens var. normalis É.Miège nom. inval.; Acacia mollissima var. angulata (Desv.) Walp.; Acacia normalis É.Miège; Acacia sulcipes G.Don nom. inval., pro syn.; Mimosa angulata (Desv.) Poir.; Mimosa decurrens Wendl.; Mimosa decurrens Donn nom. inval., nom. nud.; Racosperma decurrens (Willd.) Pedley

= Acacia decurrens =

Black wattle

Species of legume

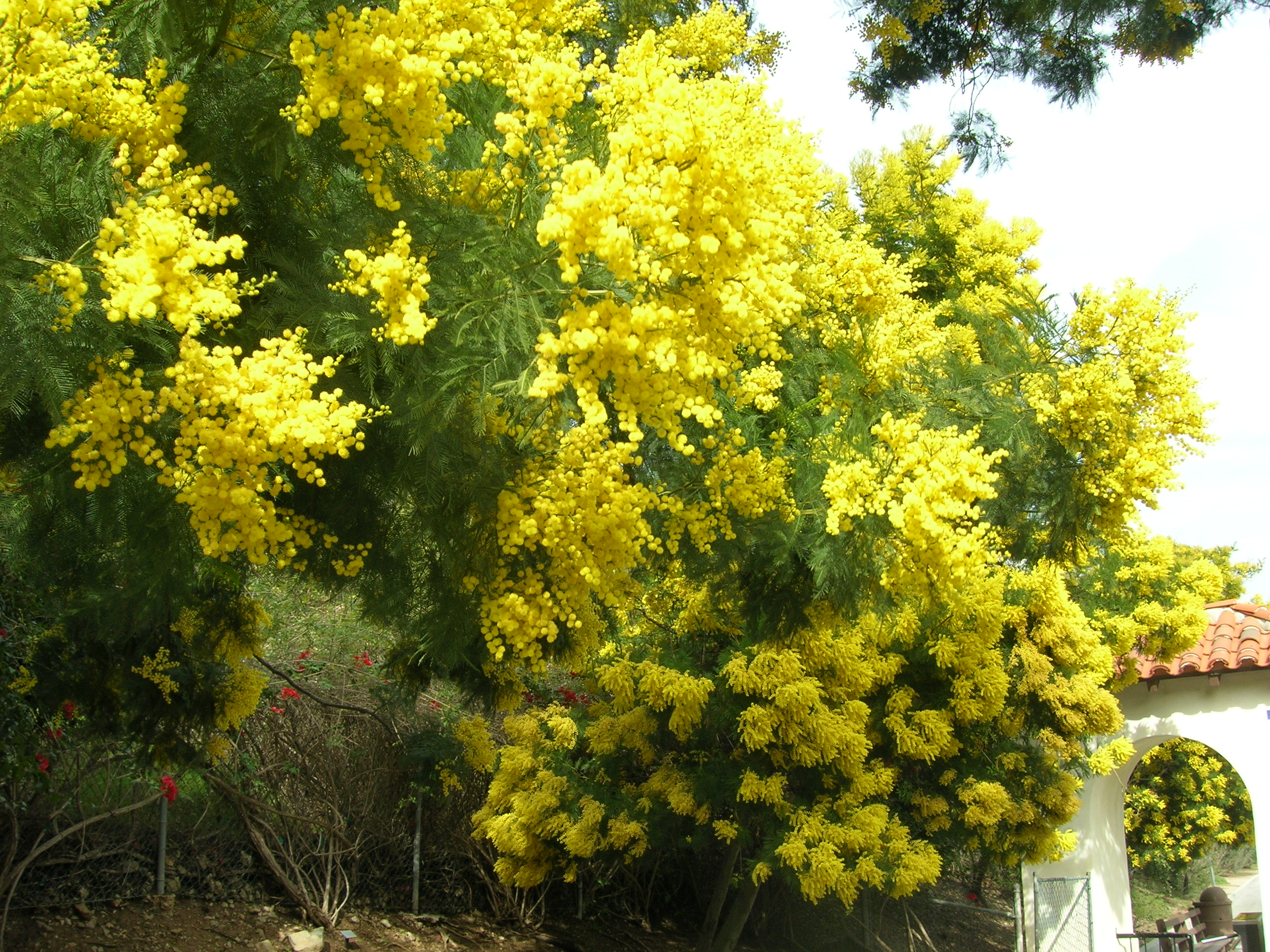
Habit in California

Acacia decurrens, commonly known as black wattle, Sydney green wattle or early green wattle and other common names, is a species of flowering plant in the family Fabaceae and is endemic to New South Wales, Australia. It is a tall shrub to tree with bipinnate, dark green leaves, spherical heads of golden yellow flowers and thinly leathery pods.

Cultivated throughout Australia, Acacia decurrens has naturalised in other Australian states and introduced to many other countries.

== Description ==
Acacia decurrens is a tall shrub or tree that typically grows to a height of up to 10 or 25 m (33 or 82 ft) and has smooth or fissured greyish black or black bark. The branchlets have winged ridges 0.5–2 mm (0.020–0.079 in) wide and are more or less glabrous. Young foliage tips are light green or yellowish. The leaves are dark green and arranged alternately, bipinnate on a petiole 15–28 mm (0.59–1.10 in) long with 3 to 13 pairs of pinnae, each with 15 to 45 pairs of linear, widely spaced pinnules 5–15 mm (0.20–0.59 in) long and 0.4–0.8 mm (0.016–0.031 in) wide on a rhachis 20–120 mm (0.79–4.72 in) long. There are glands at the base of all the pairs of the pinnae.

The flowers are borne in spherical head in elongated racemes or in groups on the ends of branches on peduncles 3–7 mm (0.12–0.28 in) long, each head 4–7 mm (0.16–0.28 in) in diameter with 20 to 32 yellow, bright yellow or golden yellow flowers. The seed pods are straight to slightly curved, more or less flat and straight sided, 20–105 mm (0.79–4.13 in) long, 5–8.5 mm (0.20–0.33 in) wide, thinly leathery and mostly slightly constricted between the seeds. The pods mature from November to January.

== Taxonomy ==
This species was first formally described in 1798 by German botanist Johann Christoph Wendland who gave it the name Mimosa decurrens in his Botanische Beobachtungen: nebst einigen neuen Gattungen und Arten before his countryman Carl Ludwig Willdenow redescribed it in the genus Acacia as A. decurrens in 1806. In his description, Willdenow did not cite Wendland but instead a 1796 description by James Donn. However, as Donn's description was a nomen nudum, the proper citation is Acacia decurrens Willd.

The specific epithet (decurrens) means 'running down', referring to the narrow ridges on the leaves that are continuous with the branchlets.

Queensland botanist Les Pedley reclassified the species as Racosperma decurrens in 2003, when he proposed placing almost all Australian members of the genus into the new genus Racosperma. However, this name is treated as a synonym of its original name.

Common names include green wattle, Sydney green wattle, early black wattle, early green wattle, black wattle, wattah and boo'kerrikin in the local Dharawal language. Maiden noted that it was called wat-tah by the indigenous people of Cumberland (Parramatta) and Camden districts. Sydney wattle was a name coined by von Mueller and early settlers around Penrith called it green wattle. Feathery wattle was another early name. It is also known as early green wattle in the Sydney basin, as it flowers in winter—earlier than similar species, such as Parramatta wattle (Acacia parramattensis), blueskin (A. irrorata) and late black wattle (A. mearnsii). It has attracted the vernacular name 'green cancer' in South Africa, where it has become weedy.

Along with other bipinnate wattles, A. decurrens is classified in the section Botrycephalae within the subgenus Phyllodineae in the genus Acacia. An analysis of genomic and chloroplast DNA along with morphological characters found that the section is polyphyletic, though the close relationships of A. decurrens and many other species were unable to be resolved.

== Distribution and habitat ==
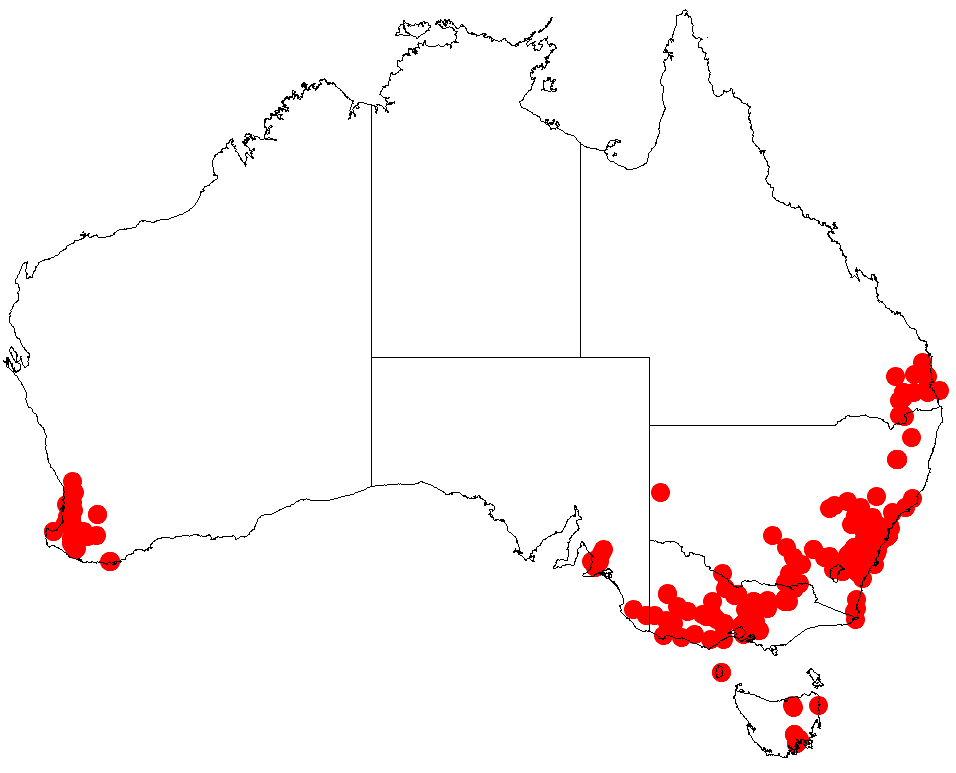
Distribution of Acacia decurrens in Australia

Acacia decurrens is native to the coast and tablelands of New South Wales and the Australian Capital Territory mainly south from the Hunter Valley, and is common in the Sydney region. It grows in forest, woodland and heath, often on river banks. It is found in altitudes up to 1,000 m (3,300 ft) with rainfall between 700–1,400 mm (28–55 in) per year, and grows with trees such as grey gum (Eucalyptus punctata) and narrow-leaved ironbark (E. crebra) in loamy soils derived mainly from Wianamatta shale and sandstone.

It was extensively planted in New South Wales, and it is difficult to tell whether it is native or naturalised in areas near its native range. The species became naturalised in other states of Australia, including Queensland, Victoria, Western Australia and Tasmania and has been introduced in other parts of the world, including India, Africa, California, South America, New Zealand and China.

== Ecology ==
The dark brown or black seed is the main source of reproduction. They can be spread by ants or birds, and form a seedbank in the soil. Seedlings generally grow rapidly after bushfire, and the species can colonise disturbed areas. Trees can live for 15 to 50 years.

Sulphur-crested cockatoos eat the unripe seed.

The foliage serves as food for the caterpillars of the double-spotted line blue (Nacaduba biocellata), moonlight jewel (Hypochrysops delicia), imperial hairstreak (Jalmenus evagoras), ictinus blue (Jalmenus ictinus), amethyst hairstreak (Jalmenus icilius) and silky hairstreak (Pseudalmenus chlorinda).

The wood serves as food for larvae of the jewel beetle species Agrilus australasiae, Cisseis cupripennis and C. scabrosula.

== Uses ==
Uses of Acacia decurrens include chemical products, environmental management, and wood. The flowers are edible and are used in fritters. An edible gum oozing from the tree's trunk can be used as a lesser-quality substitute for gum arabic, for example in the production of fruit jelly. The bark contains about 37–40% tannin. The flowers are used to produce yellow dye, and the seed pods are used to produce green dye. An organic chemical compound called kaempferol gives the flowers of A. decurrens their color. It has been grown for firewood, or as a fast-growing windbreak or shelter tree.

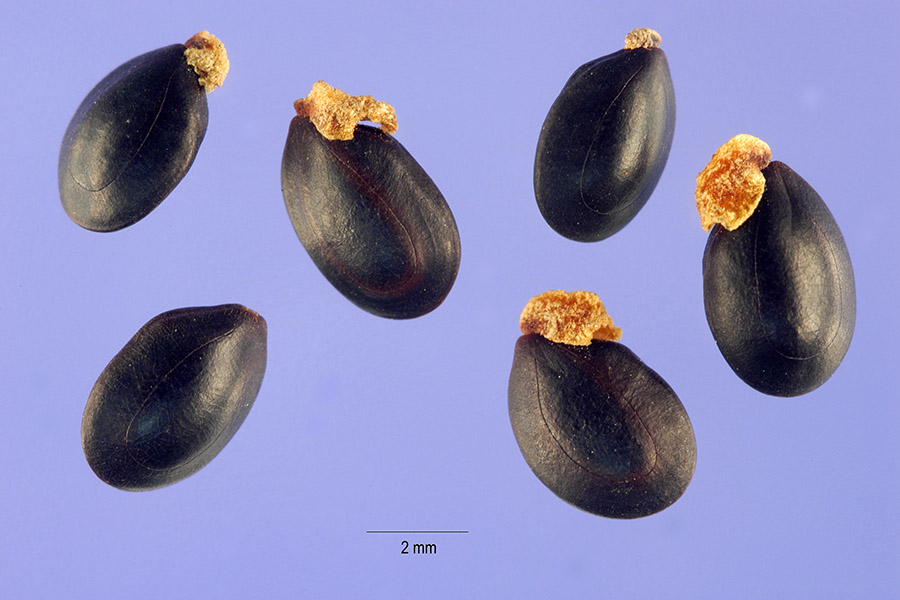
Seeds

=== Cultural significance ===
In the Dharawal story of the Boo'kerrikin Sisters, one of the kindly sisters was turned into Acacia decurrens. The other two sisters were turned into A. parvipinnula and A. parramattensis. The flowering of A. decurrens was used as a seasonal indicator of the ceasing of cold winds and the beginning of a period of gentle rain.

== Use in horticulture ==
Acacia decurrens adapts easily to cultivation and grows very quickly. It can be used as a shelter or specimen tree in large gardens and parks. The tree can look imposing when in flower. Cultivation of A. decurrens can be started by soaking the seeds in warm water and sowing them outdoors. The seeds keep their ability to germinate for many years.

Fieldwork conducted in the Southern Highlands found that the presence of bipinnate wattles (either as understory or tree) was related to reduced numbers of noisy miners, an aggressive species of bird that drives off small birds from gardens and bushland, and hence recommended the use of these plants in establishing green corridors and revegetation projects.
