= Clinopsalta adelaida =

Scientific classification
- Kingdom: Animalia
- Phylum: Arthropoda
- Clade: Pancrustacea
- Class: Insecta
- Order: Hemiptera
- Suborder: Auchenorrhyncha
- Family: Cicadidae
- Genus: Clinopsalta
- Species: C. adelaida

Binomial name
- Clinopsalta adelaida (Ashton, 1914)

Synonyms
- Cicadetta adelaida Ashton, 1914

Species of cicada

Clinopsalta adelaida is a species of cicada, also known as the Murray acacia cicada, in the true cicada family, Cicadettinae subfamily and Cicadettini tribe. It is endemic to Australia. It was described in 1914 by Australian entomologist Julian Howard Ashton.

== Description ==
The length of the forewing is 21–26 mm.

== Distribution and habitat ==
The species' range stretches from Port Augusta in South Australia through the Greater Adelaide region, along the Murray Valley and northern Victoria, then north-eastwards through New South Wales to near Moree. The associated habitat is open woodland, shrubland and mallee.

== Behaviour ==
Adults may be heard from October to February, clinging to the inner stems of shrubs and small trees, uttering calls characterised by a whirring, ratchet-like start, morphing into rapid chirping and wing-clicking.
