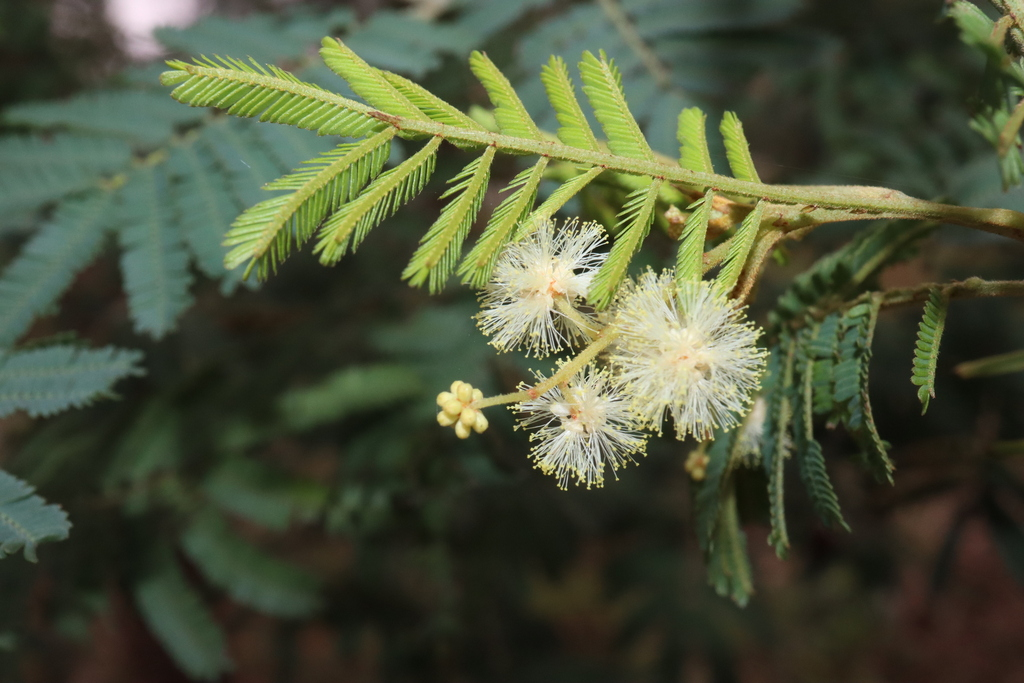

Scientific classification
- Kingdom: Plantae
- Clade: Tracheophytes
- Clade: Angiosperms
- Clade: Eudicots
- Clade: Rosids
- Order: Fabales
- Family: Fabaceae
- Subfamily: Caesalpinioideae
- Clade: Mimosoid clade
- Genus: Acacia
- Species: A. parvipinnula

Binomial name
- Acacia parvipinnula Tindale
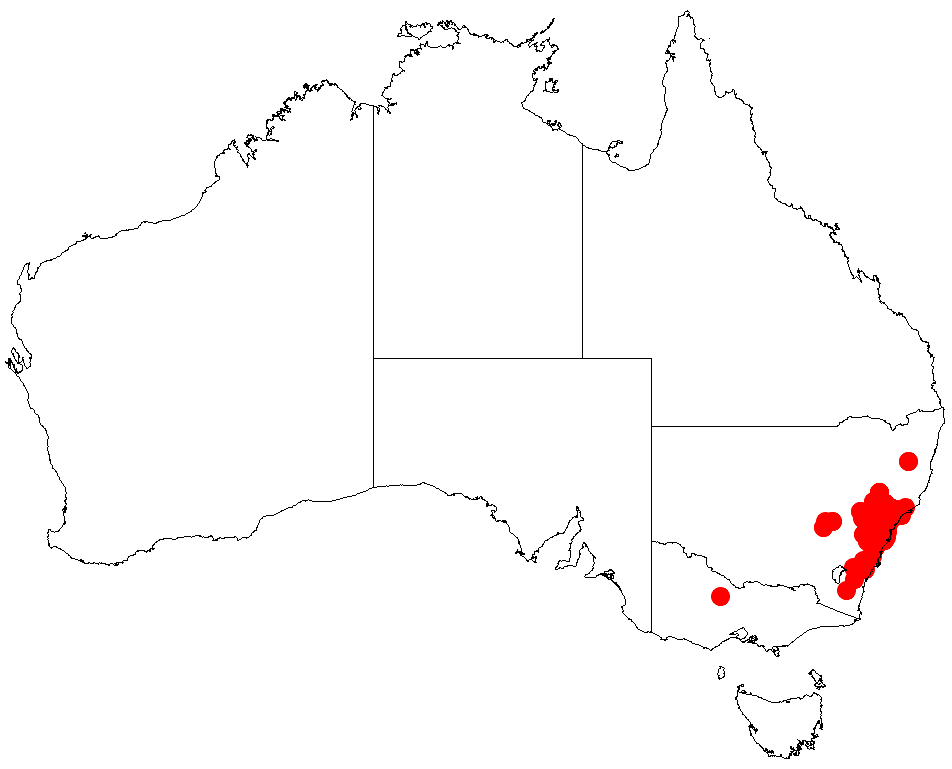
- Occurrence data from AVH

= Acacia parvipinnula =

Silver-stemmed wattle

Species of legume

Habit

Acacia parvipinnula, commonly known as silver-stemmed wattle, is a species of Acacia native to eastern Australia.

== Description ==
The shrub or tree typically grows to a height of 2 to 10 m (6 ft 7 in to 32 ft 10 in) and has an erect habit. It has silvery to bluish grey smooth bark and angled to erect branchlets that have low ridges and are often covered in a fine white powder and are densely covered with minute hairs. The leaves are 0.5 to 1.7 cm (0.20 to 0.67 in) in length and are also hairy with a rachis that has a length of 1.5 to 8 cm (0.59 to 3.15 in) and contain 4 to 13 pairs of pinnae that are 1 to 5 cm (0.39 to 1.97 in) long and composed of 13 to 42 pairs of pinnules that have a narrowly oblong shape with a length of 2 to 4 mm (0.079 to 0.157 in) and a width of 0.5 to 1 mm (0.020 to 0.039 in). It blooms between April and January producing simple inflorescences in both axillary and terminal panicles and racemes on stalks that are 2 to 5 mm (0.079 to 0.197 in) in length. The spherical flower-heads have a diameter of 4 to 6 mm (0.16 to 0.24 in) and contain 14 to 20 pale yellow flowers. Following flowering straight to curved seed pods form that are a little and usually irregularly more deeply constricted between seeds. The leathery pod are sparsely haired and are around 2 to 17 cm (0.79 to 6.69 in) in length and 5 to 8.5 mm (0.20 to 0.33 in) wide.

== Distribution ==
It has a limited distribution in coastal areas of central New South Wales from around Singleton to around the Shoalhaven River where it is found in a variety of habitats growing in many different soil types as a part of dry sclerophyll forest or woodland communities.

== Cultural significance ==
In the Dharawal story of the Boo’kerrikin Sisters, one of the kindly sisters was turned into Acacia parvipinnula. The other two sisters were turned into Acacia decurrens and Acacia parramattensis.

== See also ==
- List of Acacia species
