= Clinopsalta semilunata =

Scientific classification
- Kingdom: Animalia
- Phylum: Arthropoda
- Clade: Pancrustacea
- Class: Insecta
- Order: Hemiptera
- Suborder: Auchenorrhyncha
- Family: Cicadidae
- Genus: Clinopsalta
- Species: C. semilunata

Binomial name
- Clinopsalta semilunata Popple & Emery, 2017

Species of cicada

Clinopsalta semilunata is a species of cicada, also known as the semilunata cicada, in the true cicada family, Cicadettinae subfamily and Cicadettini tribe. It is endemic to Australia. It was described in 2017 by Australian entomologists Lindsay Popple and David L. Emery.

== Etymology ==
The species epithet semilunata comes from Latin semi- (half) and lunatus (moon), with reference to the bright semilunate markings on the mesonotum, and also alludes to the association of the species with the plant Acacia semilunata.

== Description ==
The length of the forewing is 21–24 mm.

== Distribution and habitat ==
The species occurs in inland south-eastern Queensland. The associated habitat is open forest with a middle storey of wattles.

== Behaviour ==
Adults may be heard from early September to December, clinging to the inner stems of wattles, uttering calls characterised by a series of "zit"s, intermittently punctuated by a soft rattle.
