= Clinopsalta tigris =

Scientific classification
- Kingdom: Animalia
- Phylum: Arthropoda
- Clade: Pancrustacea
- Class: Insecta
- Order: Hemiptera
- Suborder: Auchenorrhyncha
- Family: Cicadidae
- Genus: Clinopsalta
- Species: C. tigris

Binomial name
- Clinopsalta tigris (Ashton, 1914)

Synonyms
- Cicadetta tigris Ashton, 1914

Species of cicada

Clinopsalta tigris is a species of cicada, also known as the Murray acacia cicada, in the true cicada family, Cicadettinae subfamily and Cicadettini tribe. It is endemic to Australia. It was described in 1914 by Australian entomologist Julian Howard Ashton.

== Description ==
The length of the forewing is 21–24 mm.

== Distribution and habitat ==
The species' range extends over much of inland Australia. The associated habitat is scrubby woodland and acacia shrubland.

== Behaviour ==
Adults may be heard from October to February, clinging to the branches and stems of shrubs and small trees, uttering calls characterised by a clicking start, morphing into a rapid double-clicking sequence with-wing-snapping.
