= Clinopsalta =

Scientific classification
- Kingdom: Animalia
- Phylum: Arthropoda
- Clade: Pancrustacea
- Class: Insecta
- Order: Hemiptera
- Suborder: Auchenorrhyncha
- Infraorder: Cicadomorpha
- Superfamily: Cicadoidea
- Family: Cicadidae
- Subfamily: Cicadettinae
- Genus: Clinopsalta; Moulds, 2012

Genus of cicadas

Clinopsalta is a genus of cicadas, also known as acacia cicadas, in the family Cicadidae, subfamily Cicadettinae and tribe Cicadettini. It was described in 2012 by Australian entomologist Maxwell Sydney Moulds. Acacia cicadas are found in much of inland Australia and have been recorded in all mainland states as well as the Northern Territory.

== Etymology ==
The genus name Clinopsalta is derived from the Latin clinata ('bent' or 'sloping'), with reference to the shape of the forewing costa of the type species, combined with psalta (from Latin psaltria, a female harpist) which is a traditional suffix for many cicada generic names.

== Species ==
As of 2025 there were four described species in the genus:

- Clinopsalta adelaida (Ashton, 1914) (Murray Acacia Cicada)
- Clinopsalta autumna Popple & Emery, 2017 (Ferny Acacia Cicada)
- Clinopsalta semilunata Popple & Emery, 2017 (Semilunata Cicada)
- Clinopsalta tigris (Ashton, 1914) (Small Acacia Cicada)
