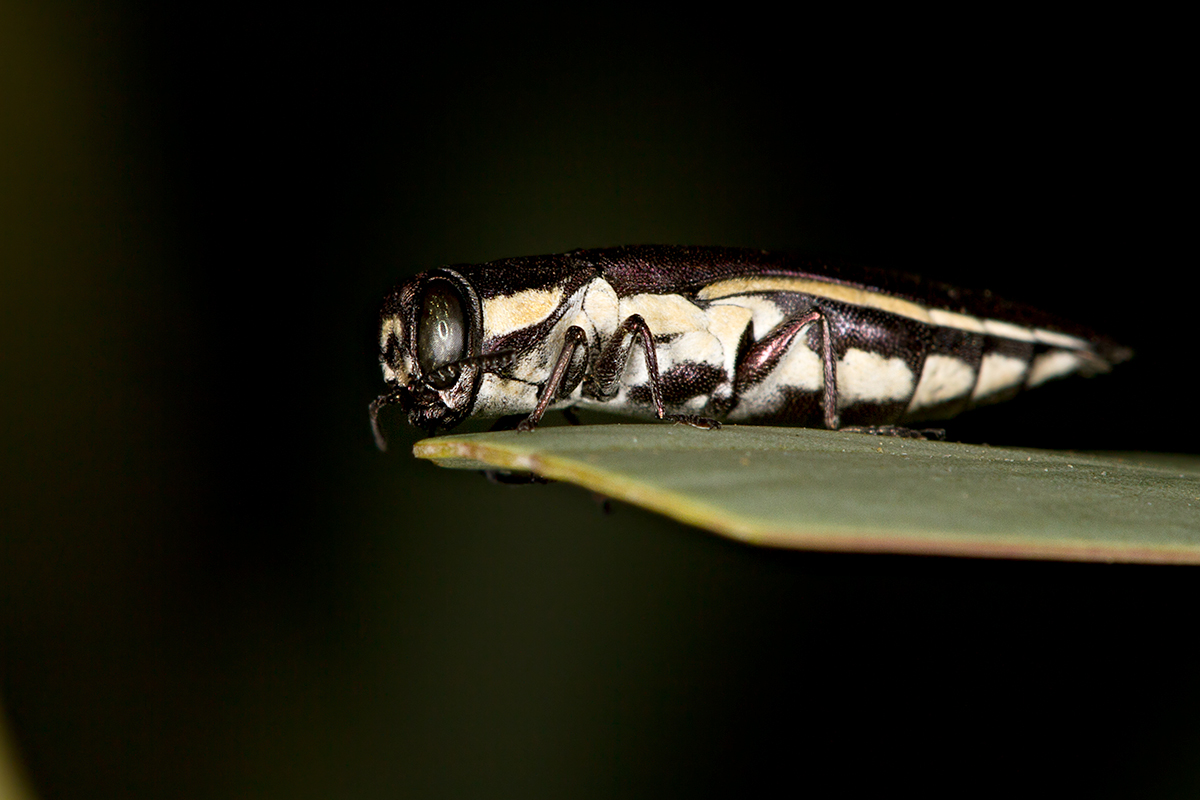

Scientific classification
- Domain: Eukaryota
- Kingdom: Animalia
- Phylum: Arthropoda
- Class: Insecta
- Order: Coleoptera
- Suborder: Polyphaga
- Infraorder: Elateriformia
- Family: Buprestidae
- Genus: Agrilus
- Species: A. australasiae

Binomial name
- Agrilus australasiae Gory & Laporte

= Agrilus australasiae =

Species of beetle

Agrilus australasiae, commonly known as the acacia flat-headed jewel beetle, is a species of beetle in the family Buprestidae, the jewel beetles, native to Australia. Among species its larvae feed on are Acacia dealbata, Acacia decurrens, Acacia parramattensis, Acacia pycnantha and Acacia sophorae.
