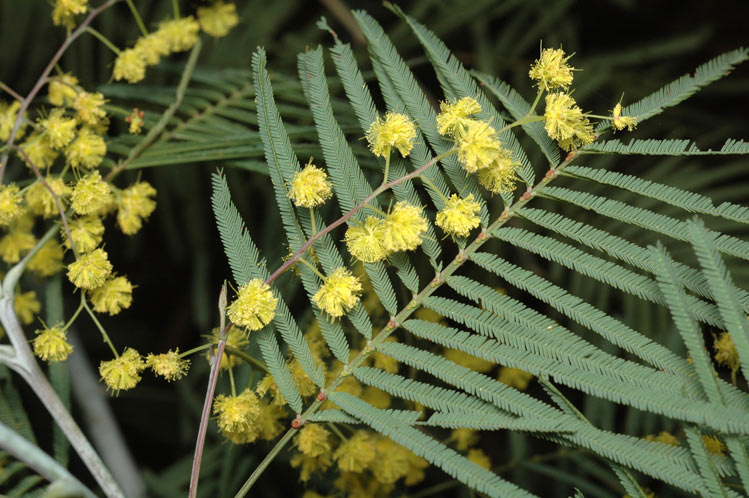
- In the Australian National Botanic Gardens

Scientific classification
- Kingdom: Plantae
- Clade: Tracheophytes
- Clade: Angiosperms
- Clade: Eudicots
- Clade: Rosids
- Order: Fabales
- Family: Fabaceae
- Subfamily: Caesalpinioideae
- Clade: Mimosoid clade
- Genus: Acacia
- Species: A. olsenii

Binomial name
- Acacia olsenii Tindale
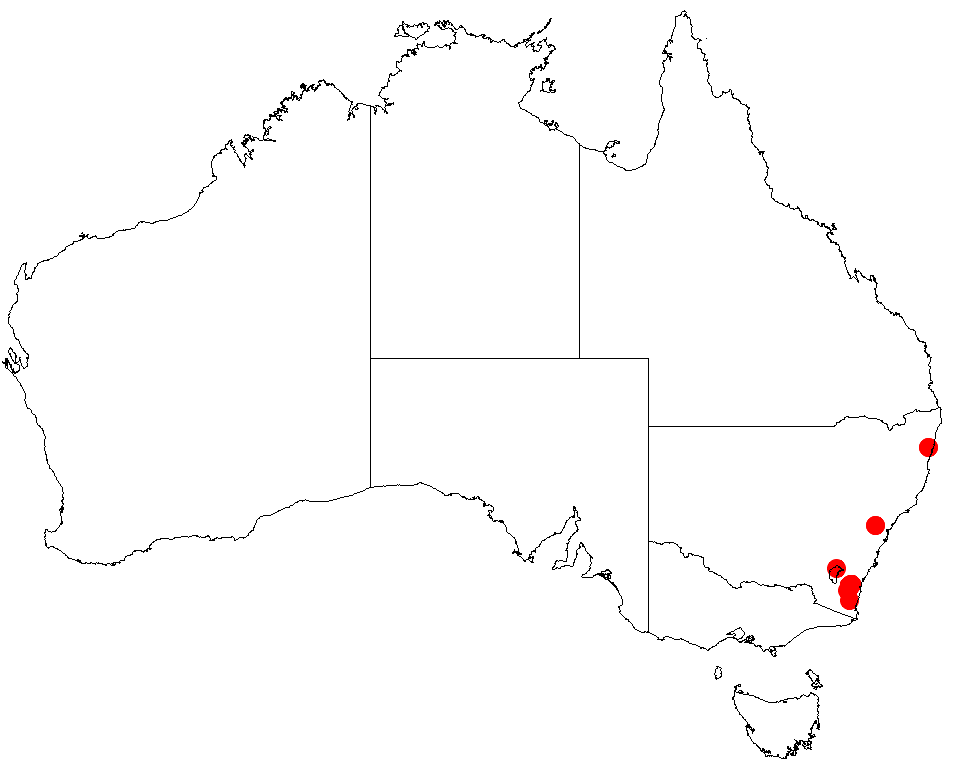
- Occurrence data from AVH

Synonyms
- Racosperma olsenii (Tindale) Pedley

= Acacia olsenii =

Species of legume

Acacia olsenii is a species of flowering plant in the family Fabaceae, and is endemic to New South Wales, Australia. It is a tree with smooth bark, mostly glabrous, angled or vertically flattened branchlets, bipinnate dark green leaves, spherical heads of bright to deep yellow flowers and straight to curved, thinly leathery, glabrous pods.

== Description ==
Acacia olsenii is a tree that typically grows to a height of 3–15 m (9.8–49.2 ft) and has smooth grey-green, dark grey brown or black bark, later slightly corrugated near the base. The branchlets are angled or vertically flattened near the ends and mostly glabrous, sometimes minutely hairy and covered with a white, powdery bloom. The leaves are bipinnate on a petiole 13–35 mm (0.51–1.38 in) long with 9 to 17 pairs of pinnae 35–83 mm (1.4–3.3 in) long on a rachis 45–100 mm (1.8–3.9 in) long. Each pinna has 50 to 106 pairs of more or less oblong to narrowly oblong pinnules, mostly 1–2.2 mm (0.039–0.087 in) long and 0.4–0.5 mm (0.016–0.020 in) wide. There is a prominent spherical and usually glabrous gland at, or near the base of the lowest pair of pinnae and usually a spherical gland at the base of some pairs of pinnae. The flowers are borne in spherical heads in axils or at the ends of branches, each head 4–6 mm (0.16–0.24 in) in diameter with 7 to 12 bright to deep yellow flowers. Flowering occurs in May, and the pods are straight to curved, more or less flat, 25–120 mm (0.98–4.72 in) long, 6–8 mm (0.24–0.31 in) wide, thinly leathery and dark brown or blackish with a prominent margin.

== Taxonomy ==
Acacia olsenii was first formally described in 1980 by Mary Tindale in the journal Telopea from specimens collected on the Bendethera Caves fire trail, 53 km (33 mi) south-south-west of Braidwood in 1975. The specific epithet (olsenii) honours Mr. Ian Olsen, formerly the landscape designer at the Royal Botanic Gardens, Sydney, who drew this species to Tindale's attention.

== Distribution and habitat ==
This species of wattle often grows in stands, usually within 50 m (160 ft) of creeks, on very steep, dry, rocky hillsides facing north-west, at the heads of gullies and knife-edge ridges in open forest, on scree, mostly on slate or shale on the Southern Tablelands of New South Wales from the Minuma Range south to Mother Woila, Tabletop Mountain and the Tuross River.
