= Agrilus hypoleucus =

Scientific classification
- Domain: Eukaryota
- Kingdom: Animalia
- Phylum: Arthropoda
- Class: Insecta
- Order: Coleoptera
- Suborder: Polyphaga
- Infraorder: Elateriformia
- Family: Buprestidae
- Genus: Agrilus
- Species: A. australasiae

Binomial name
- Agrilus australasiae Gory & Laporte

Species of beetle

Agrilus australasiae is a species of beetle in the family Buprestidae, the jewel beetles, native to Australia.
