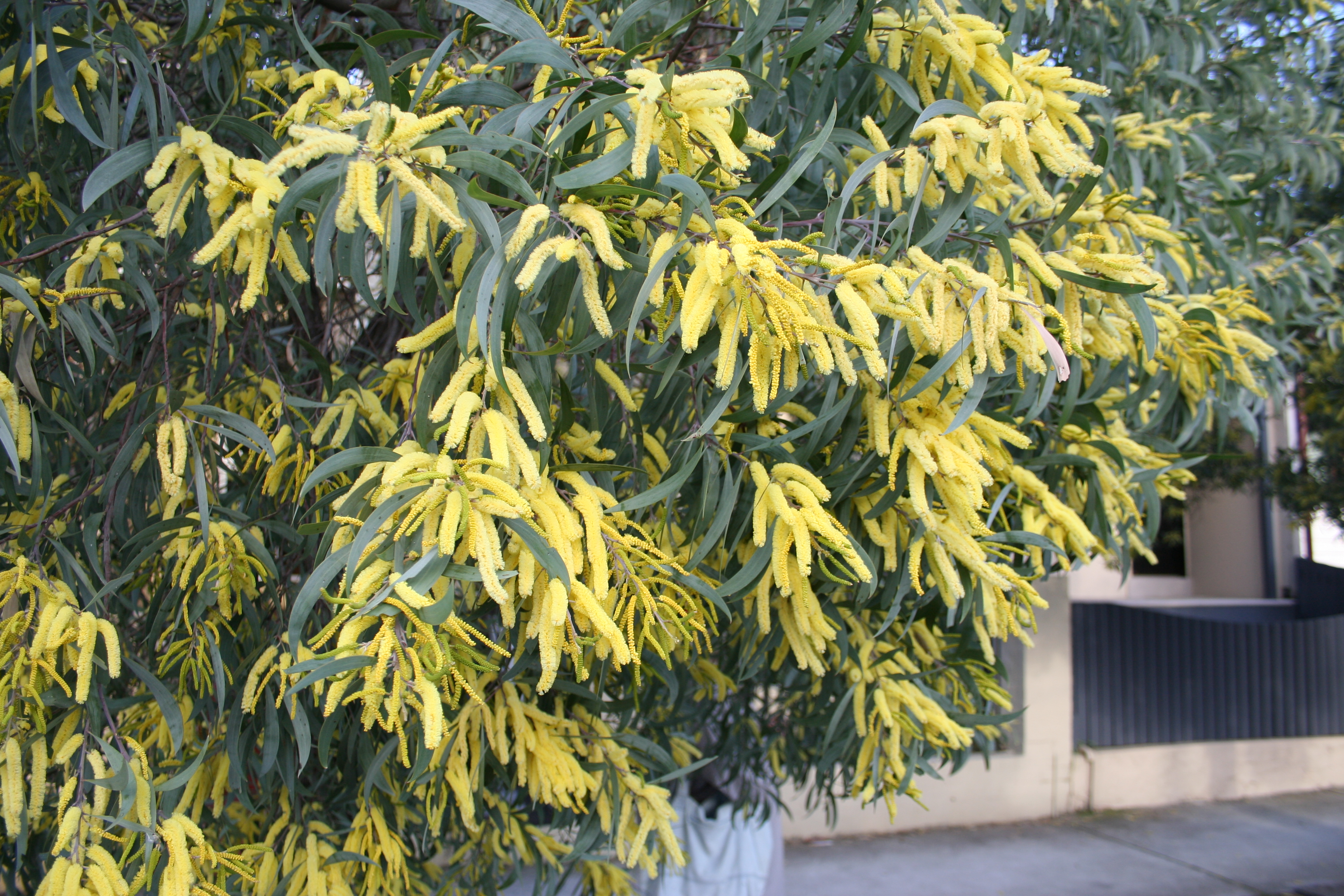

Scientific classification
- Kingdom: Plantae
- Clade: Tracheophytes
- Clade: Angiosperms
- Clade: Eudicots
- Clade: Rosids
- Order: Fabales
- Family: Fabaceae
- Subfamily: Caesalpinioideae
- Clade: Mimosoid clade
- Genus: Acacia
- Species: A. binervia

Binomial name
- Acacia binervia (J.C.Wendl.) J.F.Macbr.
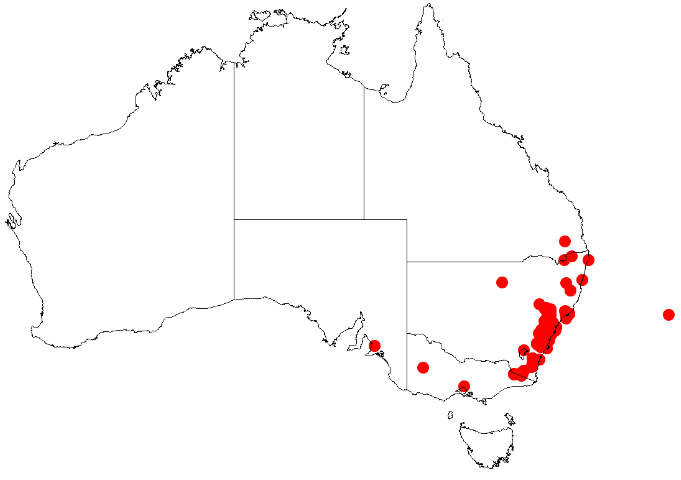
- Occurrence data from AVH

= Acacia binervia =

Coast myall

Species of plant

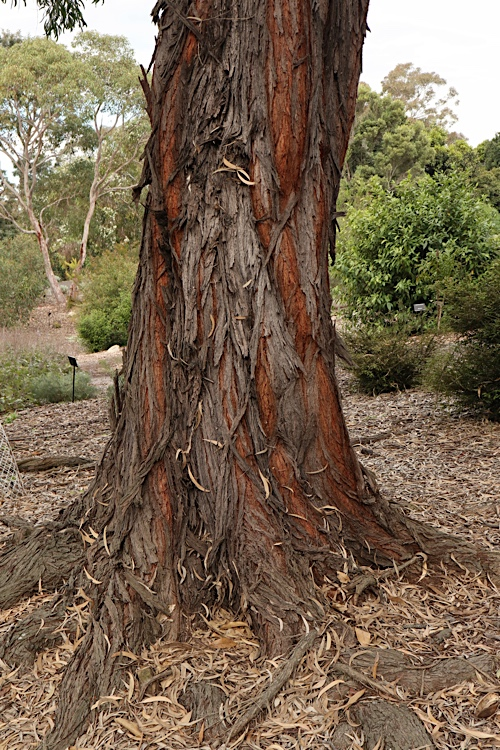
Bark in the Mount Annan Botanic Gardens

Acacia binervia, commonly known as the coast myall, coastal myall, coastal wattle, or kai'arrawan in the Dharawal language, is a species of flowering plant in the family Fabaceae and is endemic to south-eastern continental Australia. It is an erect or spreading tree or shrub, with narrowly elliptic to sickle-shaped phyllodes, pale to bright yellow flowers arranged in cylindrical heads in up to five racemes, and straight pods up to 85 mm (3.3 in) long.

== Description ==
Acacia binervia is an erect tree or spreading shrub that typically grows up to 16 m (52 ft) high and has flaky and furrowed, dark brown to grey bark. Its phyllodes are narrowly elliptic to sickle-shaped, 60–150 mm (2.4–5.9 in) long, 5–23 mm (0.20–0.91 in) wide, with branchlets flattened or angled at the end, prominently veined and usually covered thickly with whitish grey hairs flattened against the surface. The flowers are pale to bright yellow and borne in rod-shaped heads 20–60 mm (0.79–2.36 in) long in up to five axils in a raceme 1–10 mm (0.039–0.394 in) long. Each head is on a peduncle up to 5 mm (0.20 in) long. Flowering occurs in spring and the fruit is a linear pod, 20–85 mm (0.79–3.35 in) long and 3–5 mm (0.12–0.20 in) wide.

== Taxonomy ==
In 1798, German botanist Johann Christoph Wendland first described this species as Mimosa binervia in his Botanische Beobachtungen: nebst einigen neuen Gattungen und Arten. In 1919 James Francis Macbride transferred the species to Acacia as A. binervia and the change was published in Contributions of the Gray Herbarium of Harvard University. The specific epithet (binervia) refers to the phyllodes having two veins, although there are usually three to five more or less prominent veins.

== Distribution and habitat ==
Coast myall is found in central New South Wales from the Hunter Region south, and to Bungonia in the southwest, and continuing south into Victoria. In the Sydney basin, it grows on a variety of soils and associated plant communities—alluvial soils, sandstone-, shale- or trachyte-based soils, generally with good drainage. It grows in dry sclerophyll forest, associated with such species as yellow bloodwood (Corymbia eximia), grey gum (Eucalyptus punctata), narrow-leaved ironbark (E. crebra), mugga ironbark (E. sideroxylon), or more open woodland with narrow-leaved ironbark and black cypress pine (Callitris endlicheri), and riparian (riverbank) forest with river peppermint (E. elata) and gossamer wattle (Acacia floribunda). There is a single record from the upper Snowy River in Victoria.

== Ecology ==
Acacia binervia regenerates from bushfire by a soil-borne seedbank, the seeds germinate and grow after fire while adult plants are killed. The plant is reportedly toxic to livestock as the foliage phyllodes contain prussic acid. The frequency of fire for the cycle to persist is anywhere from 10 to 50 years. Coast myall is useful to bees in the honey industry.

== Conservation status ==
Coast myall is listed as "critically endangered" in Victoria in the Flora and Fauna Guarantee Act 1988.

== Cultural significance ==
For the Dharawal people, the flowering of Acacia binervia was used as a seasonal indicator of the presence of fish in bays and estuaries.

== See also ==
- List of Acacia species
