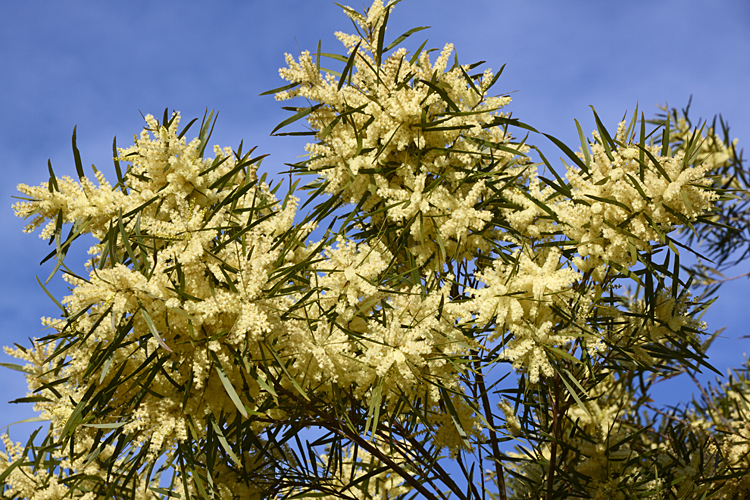

Scientific classification
- Kingdom: Plantae
- Clade: Tracheophytes
- Clade: Angiosperms
- Clade: Eudicots
- Clade: Rosids
- Order: Fabales
- Family: Fabaceae
- Subfamily: Caesalpinioideae
- Clade: Mimosoid clade
- Genus: Acacia
- Species: A. floribunda

Binomial name
- Acacia floribunda (Vent.) Willd.
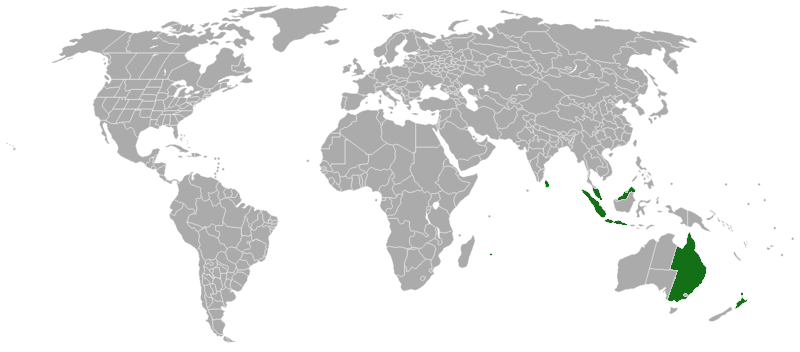

Synonyms
- Acacia angustifolia Lodd., G.Lodd. & W.Lodd. nom. illeg.; Acacia floribunda (Vent.) Willd. var. floribunda; Acacia floribunda var. latifolia Benth.; Acacia intermedia A.Cunn. ex Hook.; Acacia longifolia f. floribunda (Vent.) Voss; Acacia longifolia var. floribunda F.Muell. nom. inval.; Acacia longifolia var. floribunda (Vent.) Benth.; Acacia longifolia var. floribunda Maiden nom. illeg.; Acacia retinodes var. floribunda Court nom. inval., pro syn.; Mimosa floribunda Vent.; Phyllodoce floribunda (Vent.) Link; Racosperma floribundum (Vent.) Pedley

= Acacia floribunda =

Gossamer wattle

Species of legume

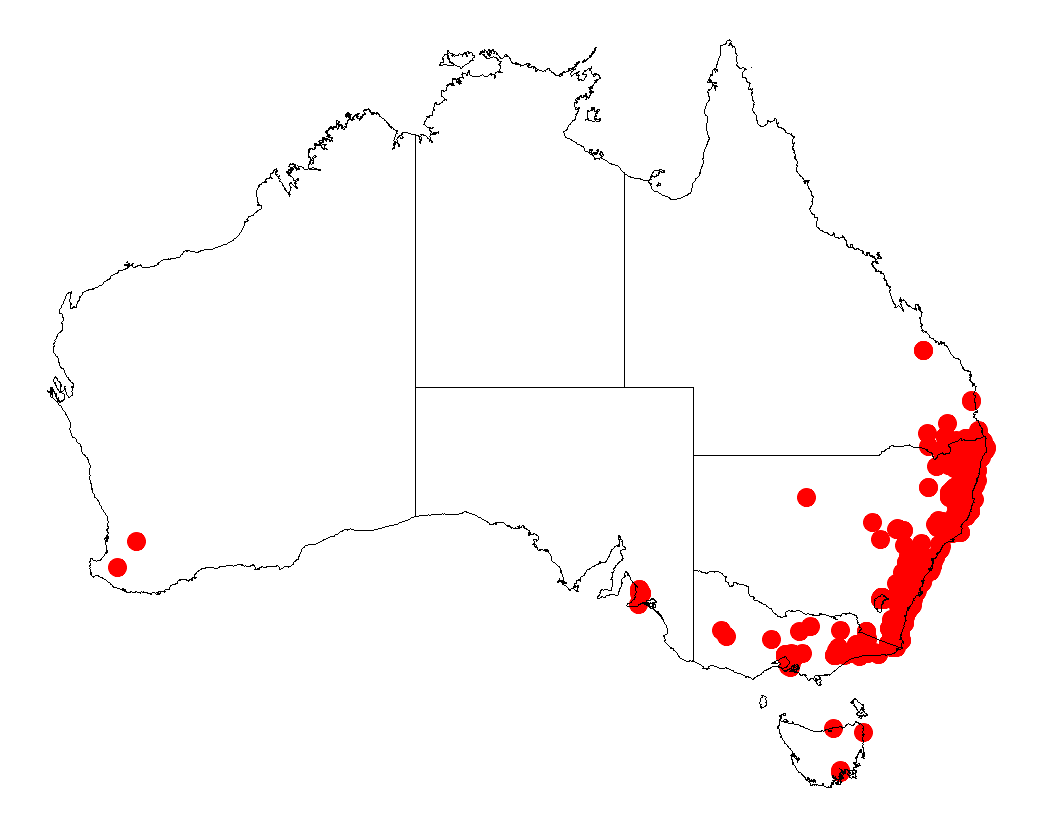
Distribution map of Acacia floribunda

Acacia floribunda, commonly known as white sally wattle, gossamer wattle, river wattle or white-sallow wattle, is a species of flowering plant in the family Fabaceae and is endemic to eastern Australia. It is a spreading shrub or tree with often pendulous branches covered with soft hairs, linear to narrowly lance-shaped phyllodes, spikes of pale yellow to more or less white flowers and straight to strongly curved, firmly papery pods.

== Description ==
Acacia floribunda is a spreading shrub or tree that typically grows to a height of 2–8 m (6 ft 7 in – 26 ft 3 in) and has smooth grey bark, sometimes becoming rough, and pendulous branches often covered with soft hairs. Its phyllodes are linear to narrowly lance-shaped, 50–190 mm (2.0–7.5 in) long, 1.5–12 mm (0.059–0.472 in) wide, thin and pliable with up to three main veins. The flowers are borne in one or two loosely packed spikes 20–80 mm (0.79–3.15 in) long on a very short peduncle. Flowering usually occurs from June to September and the pods are more or less cylindrical, mostly straight to strongly curved, 60–120 mm (2.4–4.7 in) long, 2–4 mm (0.079–0.157 in) wide, firmly papery and more or less constricted between the seeds. The seeds are elliptic, 3–5 mm (0.12–0.20 in) long and glossy brown with a small aril.

== Taxonomy ==
This species was first formally described in 1803 by Étienne Pierre Ventenat who gave it the name Mimosa floribunda in his Choix de Plantes, dont la plupart sont cultivees dans le jardin de Cels from specimens collected at Botany Bay. In 1806, Carl Ludwig Willdenow transferred the species to Acacia as A. floribunda in Species Plantarum. The specific epithet (floribunda) means 'free-flowering'.

== Distribution and habitat ==
White sally wattle is widespread in forests and woodland from Stanthorpe, Mount Barney and Tambourine Mountain in south-eastern Queensland through New South Wales to Briagolong in eastern Victoria with an isolated occurrence at Nambour. It mainly grows in coastal sclerophyll communities, often in sandy soil, and is common along the banks of streams. It is naturalised in other places in Victoria and Tasmania and possibly the Australian Capital Territory.

== Use in horticulture ==
In landscaping, Acacia floribunda is very useful for controlling erosion, especially in gullies. It is also useful as a hedge or screen plant. It can be propagated from scarified seed or treatment with boiling water.

== Phytochemistry ==
The phyllodes, twigs and bark of this species contains the compound NN-Dimethyltryptamine (DMT) (0.4-0.5%) and other substituted tryptamines.
