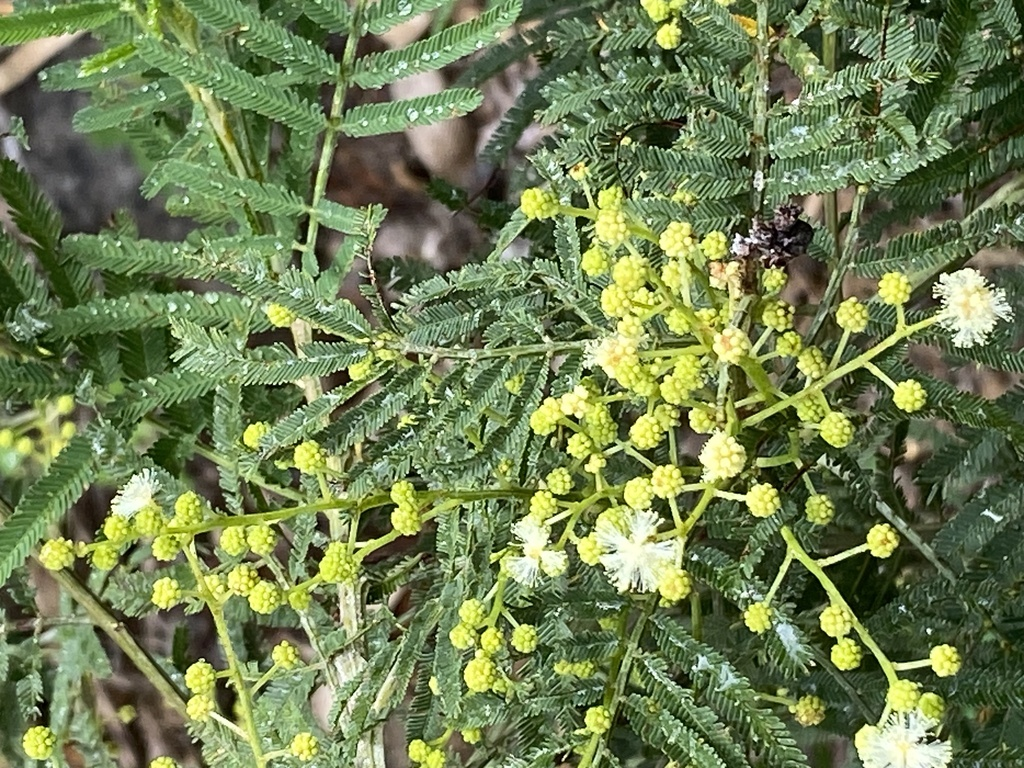
- In the Bunya Mountains National Park

Scientific classification
- Kingdom: Plantae
- Clade: Embryophytes
- Clade: Tracheophytes
- Clade: Spermatophytes
- Clade: Angiosperms
- Clade: Eudicots
- Clade: Rosids
- Order: Fabales
- Family: Fabaceae
- Subfamily: Caesalpinioideae
- Clade: Mimosoid clade
- Genus: Acacia
- Species: A. irrorata

Binomial name
- Acacia irrorata Sieber ex Spreng.
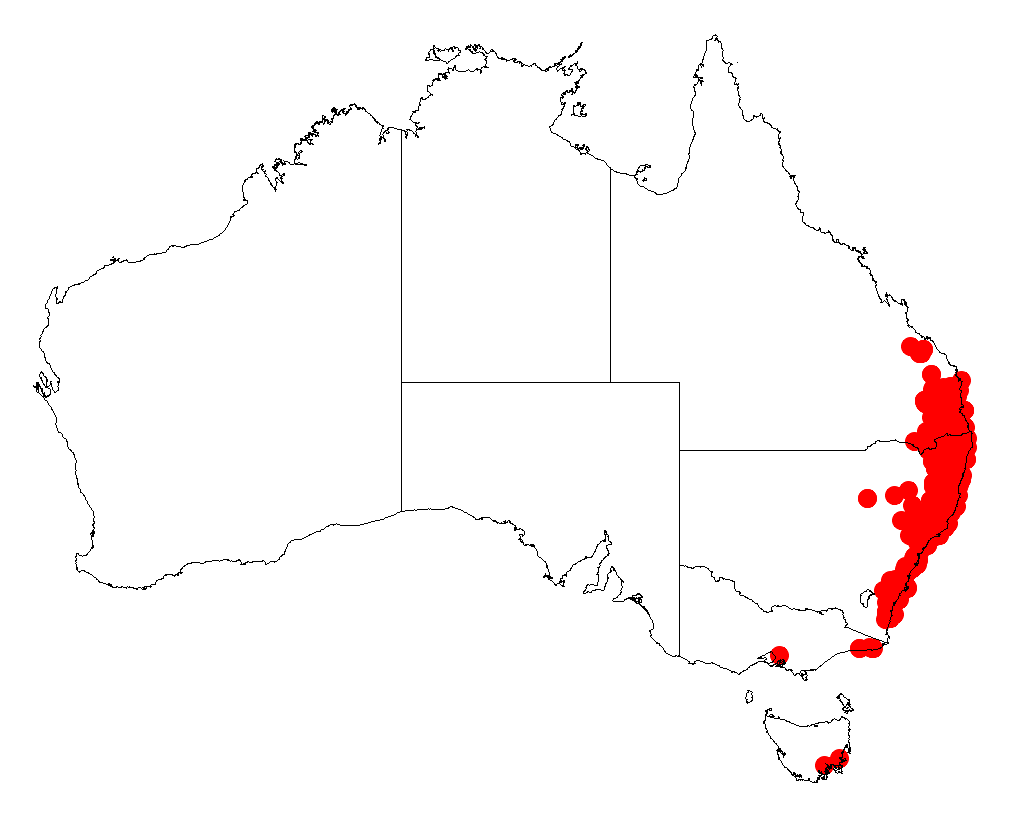
- Occurrence data from AVH

Synonyms
- Acacia pauciglandulosa S.W.L.Jacobs & J.Pickard nom. inval., pro syn.; Racosperma irroratum (Sieber ex Spreng.) Pedley

= Acacia irrorata =

Species of legume

Acacia irrorata, colloquially known as green wattle or blueskin, is a species of flowering plant in the family Fabaceae and is endemic to eastern Australia. It is an erect shrub or tree with bipinnate leaves with 5 to 21 pairs of pinnae, each with 15 to 72 pairs of crowded, overlapping pinnules, spherical heads of pale yellow to cream-coloured flowers and straight or curved pods.

== Description ==
Acacia irrorata is an erect shrub or tree that typically grows to a height of 4–12 m (13–39 ft) and usually has smooth bark and ridged branchlets covered with soft yellow or white hairs. The leaves are dark green and bipinnate on a petiole 7–21 mm (0.28–0.83 in) long, with 5 to 21 pairs of pinnae 15–45 mm (0.59–1.77 in) long on a rachis 20–110 mm (0.79–4.33 in) long, each pinna with 15 to 72 crowded, overlapping pinnules mostly 2–5 mm (0.079–0.197 in) long and 0.4–0.7 mm (0.016–0.028 in) wide. There are sometimes glands on the lowest pairs of pinnae. The flowers are borne in spherical heads in racemes or panicles in axils or on the ends of branches, the heads with 15 to 50 usually cream-coloured to pale yellow flowers on peduncles 2–7 mm (0.079–0.276 in) long. Flowering occurs in any month and the pods are 20–120 mm (0.79–4.72 in) long and 5–11.5 mm (0.20–0.45 in) wide, more or less flat, leathery, black and appearing somewhat like a string of beads.

== Taxonomy ==
Acacia irrorata was first formally described in 1826 by Kurt Sprengel in Systema Vegetabilium from an unpublished description by Franz Sieber. In 1966, Mary Tindale described Acacia irrorata subsp. velutinella and its name and that of the autonym (Acacia irrorata subsp. irrorata) are accepted by the Australian Plant Census:

- Acacia irrorata Sieber ex Spreng. subsp. irrorata has urn-shaped glands with small openings, usually present at the last and lowest pairs of pinnae, rarely on the base of the upper two to four pairs.
- Acacia irrorata Tindale subsp. velutinella has pouch-shaped glands with large openings, usually present on the uppermost one to four and lowest pairs of pinnae.

== Distribution and habitat ==
Green wattle is mainly found on the coast and ranges of New South Wales and south-east Queensland, north from Bermagui in forest or the edges of rainforest, often near watercourses.

== Conservation status ==
Acacia irrorata is listed as of 'least concern' by the Queensland Government Department of Environment and Science.
