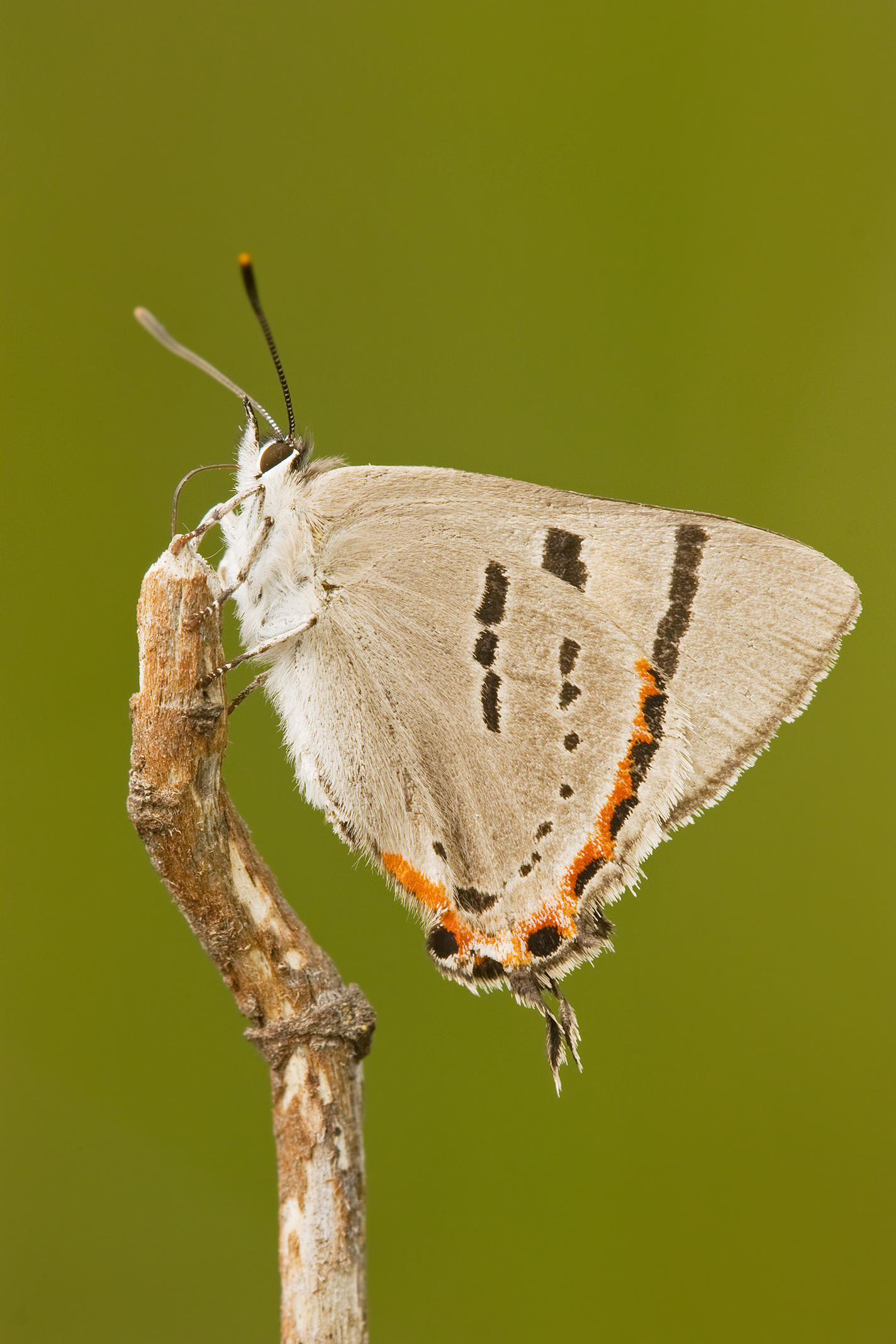

Scientific classification
- Domain: Eukaryota
- Kingdom: Animalia
- Phylum: Arthropoda
- Class: Insecta
- Order: Lepidoptera
- Family: Lycaenidae
- Tribe: Zesiini
- Genus: Pseudalmenus
- Species: P. chlorinda

Binomial name
- Pseudalmenus chlorinda Blanchard, 1848

= Silky hairstreak =

Species of butterfly

The silky hairstreak or chlorinda hairstreak (Pseudalmenus chlorinda) is a butterfly belonging to the family Lycaenidae. The species was first described by Emile Blanchard in 1848. It occurs in Australia. It is the only species in the monotypic genus Pseudalmenus, described by Hamilton Herbert Druce in 1902.

== Taxonomy ==
Subspecies include:

- P. c. chlorinda is found in Tasmania.
- P. c. myrsilus is found in a restricted area of south-east Tasmania. It is classified as rare under the Tasmanian Threatened Species Protection Act 1995.
- P. c. zephyrus is found in eastern Victoria
- P. c. fisheri is found in the Grampians National Park, Victoria
- P. c. chloris is found around Katoomba and Mittagong, New South Wales
- P. c. barringtonensis is found in the area of Barrington Tops, New South Wales

== Description ==
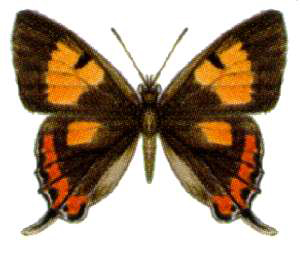

The adult silky hairstreak has a wingspan of 28 mm. The male and female are similar, with the wings of the female slightly more rounded. The wings are black or brown on top with yellow-orange patches. The lower wings have orange patches and black tails with white edges. The underside of the wings is yellow grey with black and orange markings. The eggs are pale green with a diameter about 1 mm. They are usually laid in small groups on the twigs of a food plant.

The caterpillars grow to a length of around 3 cm. They have a black head and a brown, red, black and yellow body. The larvae of the silky hairstreak secrete substances that attract Anonychomyrma biconvexa ants.

== Distribution and habitat ==
It is found in south-eastern Australia including New South Wales, Victoria and Tasmania. The species only occurs where the attendant ant species is found, and the larval food plant grows.

The caterpillars feed on various Acacia species including the A. dealbata, A. decurrens, A. elata, A. mearnsii, A. melanoxylon, A. obtusata, A. pravissima, A. terminalis and the A. trachyphloia.

== See also ==
- Papilionidae
- List of butterflies of Tasmania
