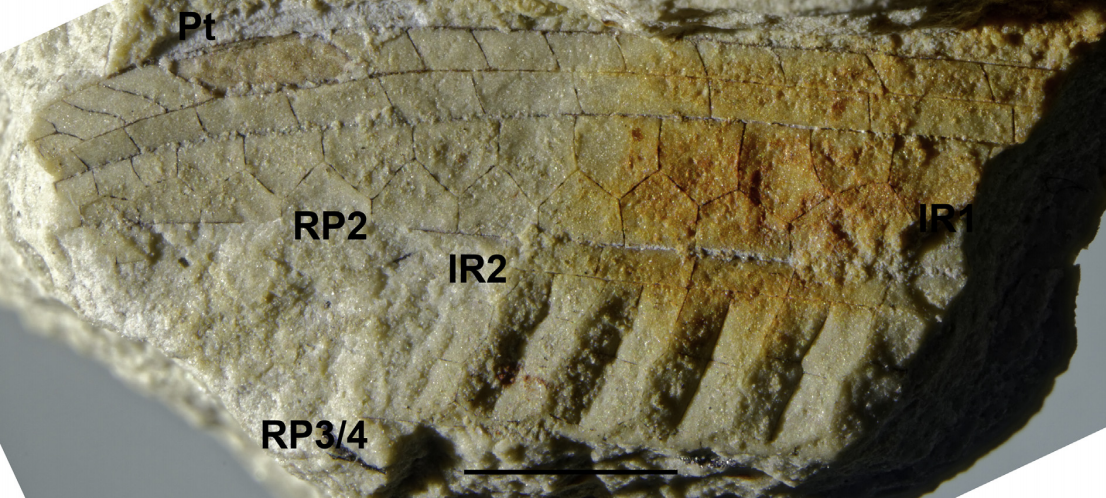
- Steleopteron cretacicus

Scientific classification
- Kingdom: Animalia
- Phylum: Arthropoda
- Class: Insecta
- Order: Odonata
- Suborder: Zygoptera
- Family: †Steleopteridae
- Genus: †Steleopteron; Handlirsch, 1906

Species
- †S. cretacicus; †S. deichmuelleri

= Steleopteron =

Steleopteron Temporal range: Jurassic-Cretaceous

Extinct genus of damselflies

Steleopteon is a genus of extinct winged damselflies whose fossils have been found in modern Germany, and Great Britain, and which lived at the end of the Jurassic and the beginning of the Cretaceous (150.8 to 130 million years ago).

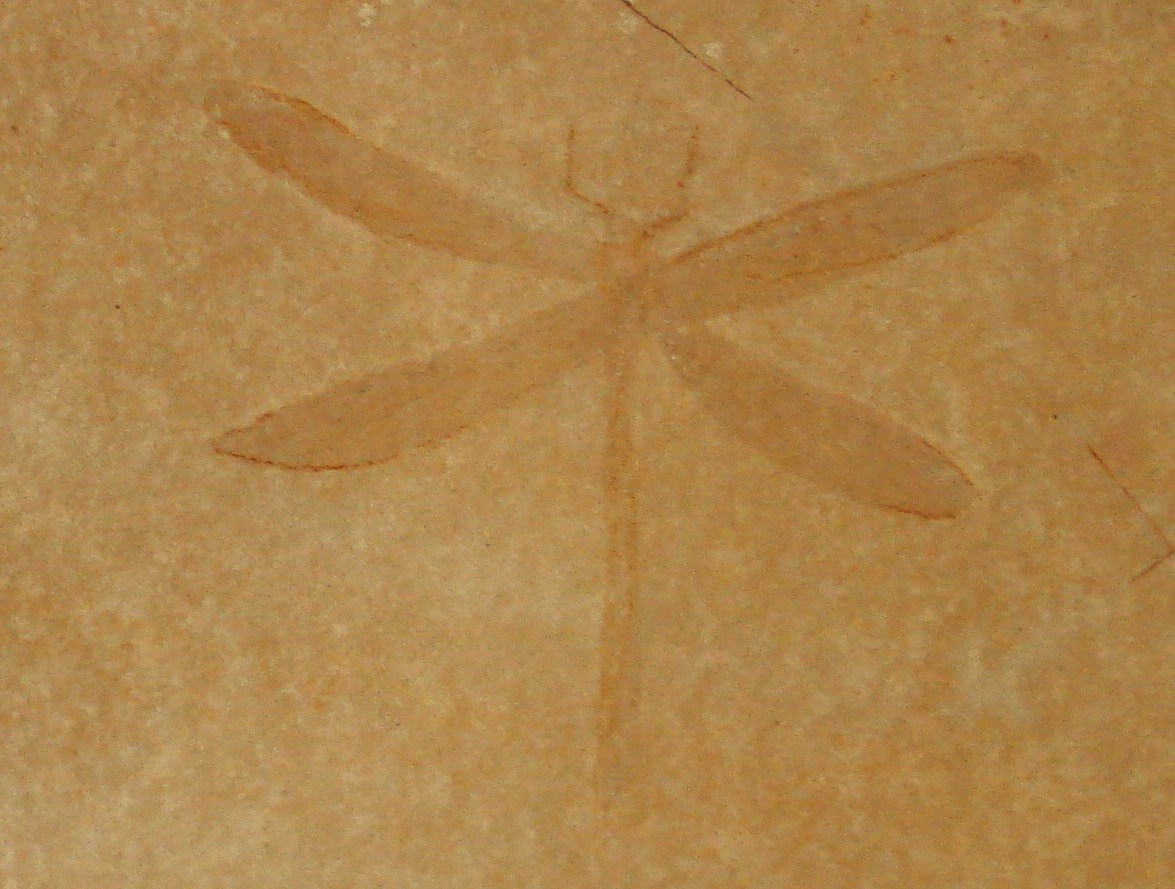
Steleopteron deichmuelleri

The genus was described by the Austrian paleoentomologist Anton Handlirsch in 1906 on the basis of the fossilised exoskeleton Steleopteron deichmuelleri. Until 2018, it had been believed that the genus became extinct in the Jurassic, but the discovery of Steleopteron cretacicus showed that the genus and the family may have become extinct as late as the Cretaceous. In 2001, Fleck and others transferred the family, Steleopteridae to a suborder of winged damselflies, Zygoptera.

They were fast flying insectivorous/carnivorous predators.

According to the Fossilworks Database website, as of November 2019, the genus includes two extinct species:

- Steleopteron cretacicus Zheng et al. 2018
- Steleopteron deichmuelleri Handlirsch, 1906
