= Anonychomyrma gigantea =

Scientific classification
- Domain: Eukaryota
- Kingdom: Animalia
- Phylum: Arthropoda
- Class: Insecta
- Order: Hymenoptera
- Family: Formicidae
- Subfamily: Dolichoderinae
- Genus: Anonychomyrma
- Species: A. gigantea

Binomial name
- Anonychomyrma gigantea (Donisthorpe, 1943)

Species of ant

Anonychomyrma gigantea is a species of ant in the genus Anonychomyrma. Described by Donisthorpe in 1943, the species is endemic to New Guinea.
