= Anonychomyrma longicapitata =

Scientific classification
- Domain: Eukaryota
- Kingdom: Animalia
- Phylum: Arthropoda
- Class: Insecta
- Order: Hymenoptera
- Family: Formicidae
- Subfamily: Dolichoderinae
- Genus: Anonychomyrma
- Species: A. longicapitata

Binomial name
- Anonychomyrma longicapitata (Donisthorpe, 1947)

Species of ant

Anonychomyrma longicapitata is a species of ant in the genus Anonychomyrma. Described by Donisthorpe in 1947, the species is endemic to New Guinea.
