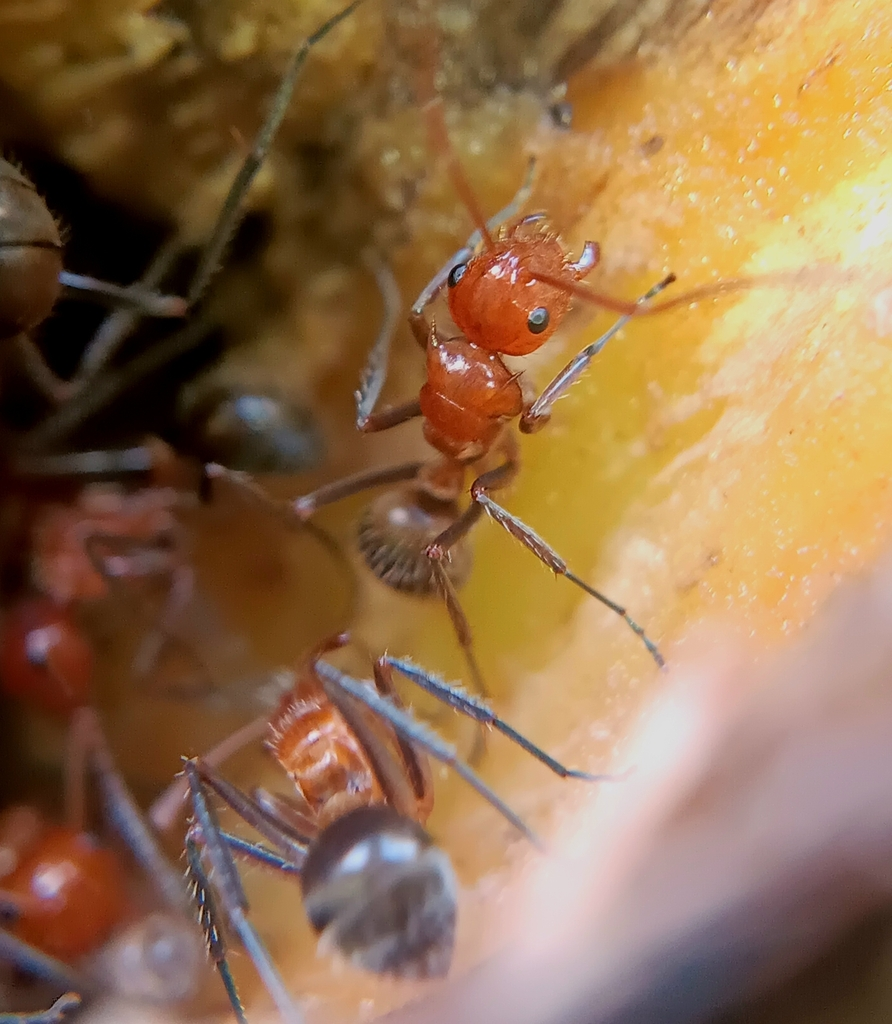

Scientific classification
- Kingdom: Animalia
- Phylum: Arthropoda
- Clade: Pancrustacea
- Class: Insecta
- Order: Hymenoptera
- Family: Formicidae
- Subfamily: Formicinae
- Genus: Camponotus
- Subgenus: Phasmomyrmex
- Species: C. castanicola

Binomial name
- Camponotus castanicola Donisthorpe, 1943

= Camponotus castanicola =

Species of ant

Camponotus castanicola is a species of carpenter ant native to the Philippines.
