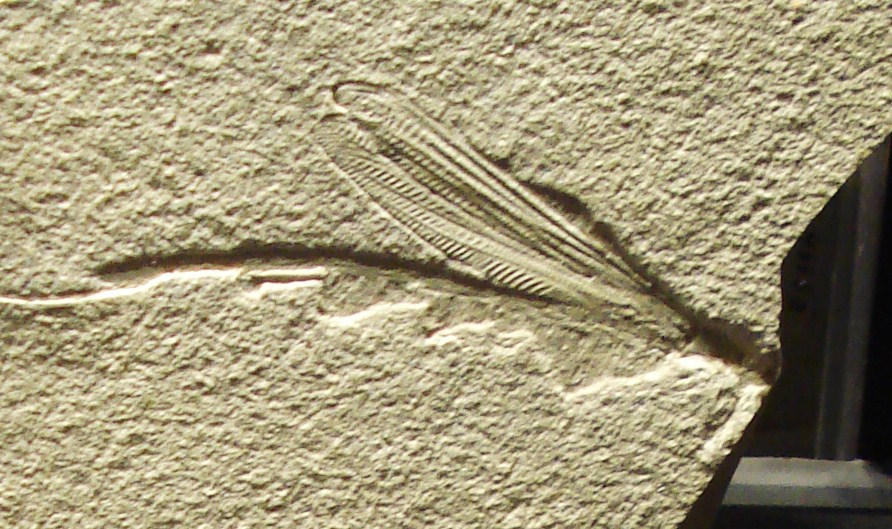
- Parasteleopteron guischardi

Scientific classification
- Kingdom: Animalia
- Phylum: Arthropoda
- Clade: Pancrustacea
- Class: Insecta
- Order: Odonata
- Suborder: Zygoptera
- Family: †Steleopteridae; Handlirsch, 1906

Genera
- †Auliella; †Euparasteleopteron; †Parasteleopteron; †Steleopteron

= Steleopteridae =

Steleopteridae Temporal range: Jurassic-Cretaceous

Extinct family of insects

Steleopteridae is a family of extinct winged damselflies whose fossils have been found in modern Germany, Great Britain and Kazakhstan, and which lived at the end of the Jurassic and the beginning of the Cretaceous (166.1–130.0 million years ago).

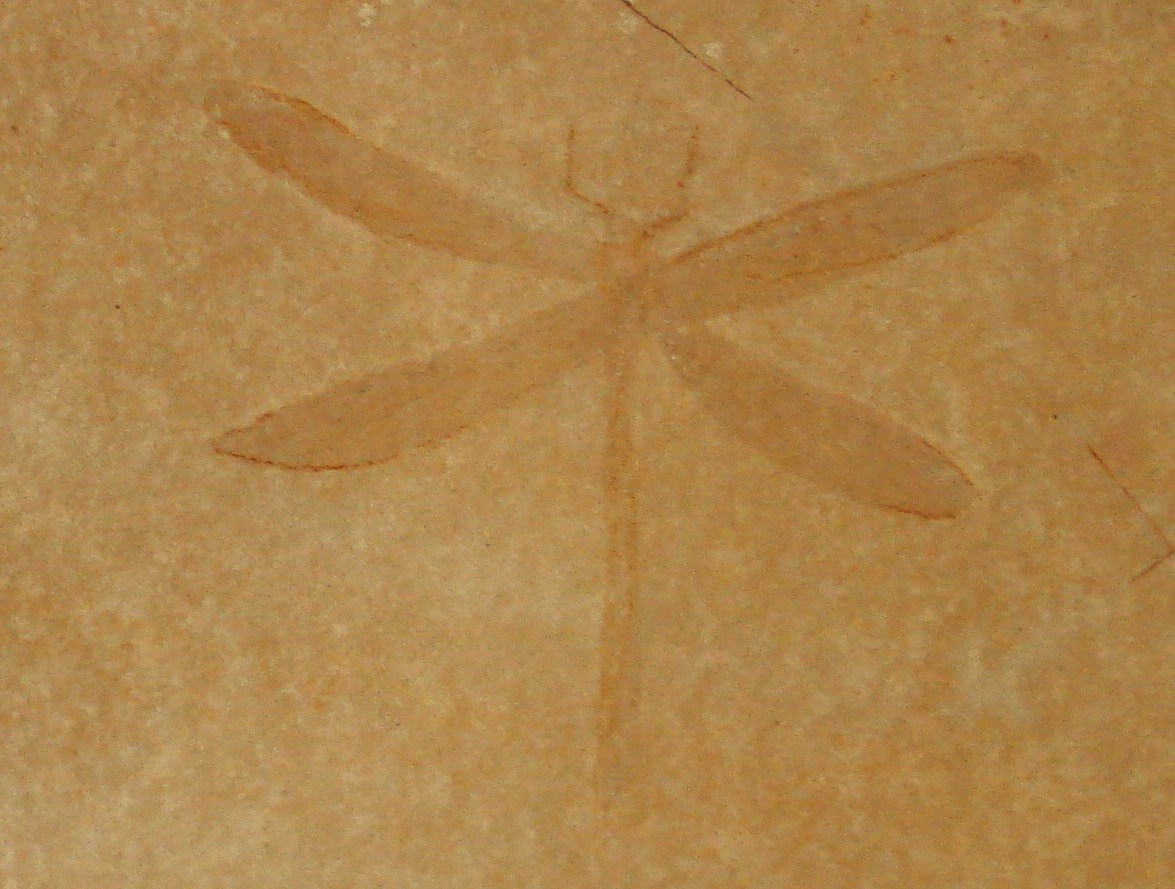
Steleopteron deichmuelleri

The family was described by the Austrian paleoentomologist Anton Handlirsch in 1906 on the basis of the fossilised exoskeleton Steleopteron deichmuelleri. Hence, the type genus is Steleopteron. Handlirsch assigned the family to the Epiproctophora. In 2001, the family was excluded from the Epiproctophora and transferred into a suborder of winged damselflies, Zygoptera. Until 2018, it had been believed that Steleopteridae became extinct in the Jurassic, but the discovery of Steleopteron cretacicus showed that the family may have become extinct as late as the Cretaceous.

They were fast flying insectivorous/carnivorous predators.

According to the Fossilworks Database website, as of November 2019, the family includes 5 extinct species:

- Auliella crucigera Pritykina, 1968
- Euparasteleopteron viohli Fleck et al., 2001
- Parasteleopteron guischardi Fleck et al., 2001
- Steleopteron cretacicus Zheng et al. 2018
- Steleopteron deichmuelleri Handlirsch, 1906
