= Eduard Enslin =

German ophthalmologist and entomologist (1879–1970)

Eduard Enslin (4 October 1879 Nuremberg - 26 December 1970, Rummelsberg, Nuremberg) was a German ophthalmologist and entomologist. He was a specialist in plant wasps (Symphyta). His extensive collection, which includes specimens from his collection trips to southern Europe, the Mediterranean region (including Greece, Corfu, Rhodes, Palestine (1927), Egypt (1934)) and India (1929), as well as his material from Germany, is held by Zoologische Staatssammlung München. It includes his many type specimens.

Enslin was born in Nuremberg, the son of trader Georg Heinrich Enslin and Luise Margarete Magdalene born Stich. After studies at the gymnasium he went to study medicine at Erlangen, Greifswald and Munich receiving a summa cum laude in 1902. Even as a school student he became a member of the natural history society at Nuremberg.

== Selected publications ==
- 1913-1918. Die Tenthredioidea Mitteleuropas Berlin: Friedländer
- 1929. Beiträge zur Metamorphose der Goldwespen [Hermsdorf bei] Berlin: Dr. W. Stichel
- 1914-[26]. with Otto Schmiedeknecht, Jean-Jacques Kieffer, Heinrich Friese, Christoph Wilhelm Marcus Schroder and Hermann Stitz Die insekten Mitteleuropas insbesondere Deutschlands. Stuttgart, Franckhsche verlagshandlung
- August 1950. "On the Chrysididae (Hymenoptera) of Cyprus". Annals and Magazine of Natural History. London 12 (3): 656-671.
- 1952. "Alpine Hymenopterenfunde aus dem Allgäu". Nachrichtenblatt der Bayerischen Entomologen, Munich. 1 (4): 31.

Manfred Kraus and Stephan M. Blank (1998) give a bibliography of his 133 publications.
