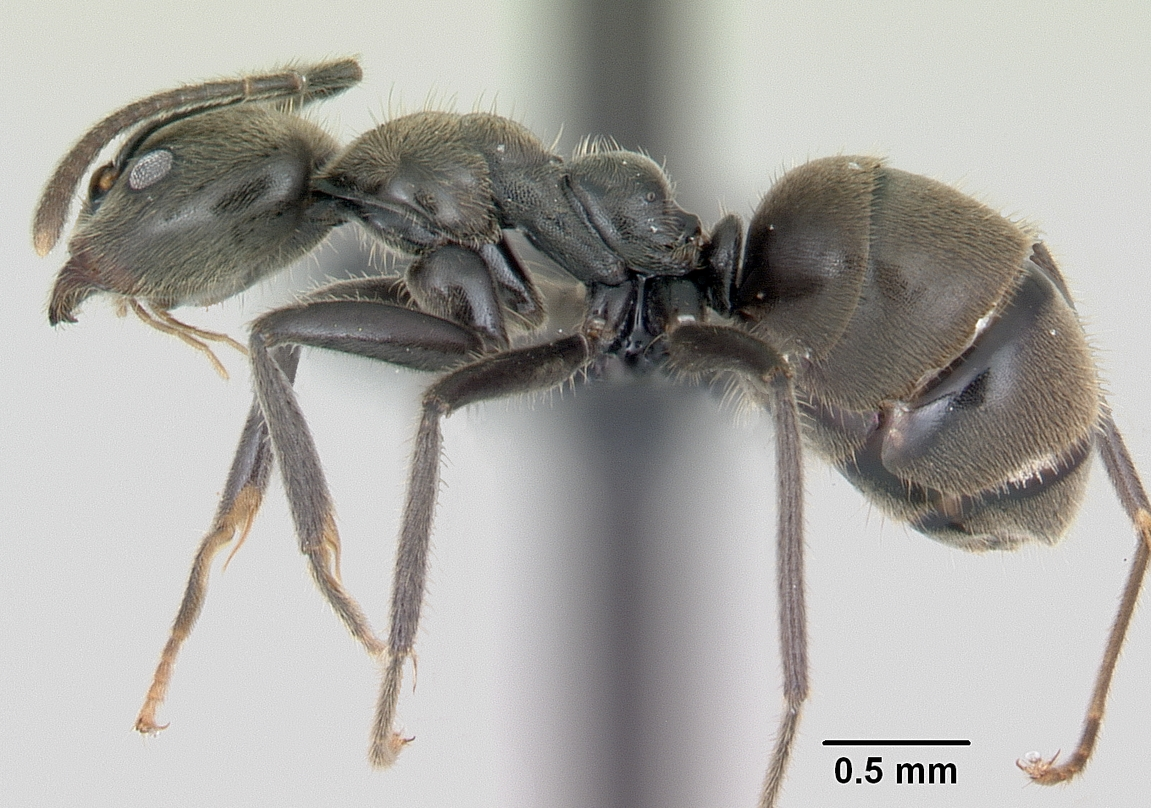
- Anonychomyrma gilberti worker

Scientific classification
- Kingdom: Animalia
- Phylum: Arthropoda
- Class: Insecta
- Order: Hymenoptera
- Family: Formicidae
- Subfamily: Dolichoderinae
- Tribe: Leptomyrmecini
- Genus: Anonychomyrma; Donisthorpe, 1947

Type species
- Anonychomyrma myrmex Donisthorpe, 1947

Diversity
- 26 species

= Anonychomyrma =

Anonychomyrma Temporal range: Lutetian–Recent

Genus of ants

Anonychomyrma is a genus of ants in the subfamily Dolichoderinae.

== Distribution and habitat ==
This genus is mainly distributed in New Guinea, Solomon Islands and Australia; a single species is known from Malaysia and Indonesia. They nest on the ground or in trees, with colonies consisting of 567 to tens of thousands individuals.

== Species ==
- Anonychomyrma anguliceps (Forel, 1901)
- Anonychomyrma angusta (Stitz, 1911)
- Anonychomyrma arcadia (Forel, 1915)
- Anonychomyrma biconvexa (Santschi, 1928)
- Anonychomyrma dimorpha (Viehmeyer, 1912)
- Anonychomyrma extensa (Emery, 1887)
- Anonychomyrma fornicata (Emery, 1914)
- Anonychomyrma froggatti (Forel, 1902)
- Anonychomyrma gigantea (Donisthorpe, 1943)
- Anonychomyrma gilberti (Forel, 1902)
- Anonychomyrma glabrata (Smith, 1857)
- Anonychomyrma incisa (Stitz, 1932)
- Anonychomyrma inclinata
- Anonychomyrma itinerans (Lowne, 1865)
- Anonychomyrma longicapitata (Donisthorpe, 1947)
- Anonychomyrma longiceps (Forel, 1907)
- Anonychomyrma malandana (Forel, 1915)
- Anonychomyrma minuta (Donisthorpe, 1943)
- Anonychomyrma murina (Emery, 1911)
- Anonychomyrma myrmex Donisthorpe, 1947
- Anonychomyrma nitidiceps (André, 1896)
- Anonychomyrma polita (Stitz, 1912)
- Anonychomyrma procidua (Erichson, 1842)
- Anonychomyrma purpurescens (Lowne, 1865)
- Anonychomyrma scrutator (Smith, 1859)
- Anonychomyrma sellata (Stitz, 1911)
- Anonychomyrma tigris (Stitz, 1912)
