= Crematogaster aculeata =

Scientific classification
- Domain: Eukaryota
- Kingdom: Animalia
- Phylum: Arthropoda
- Class: Insecta
- Order: Hymenoptera
- Family: Formicidae
- Subfamily: Myrmicinae
- Genus: Crematogaster
- Species: C. aculeata

Binomial name
- Crematogaster aculeata Donisthorpe, 1941

Species of ant

Crematogaster aculeata is a species of ant in tribe Crematogastrini. It was described by Donisthorpe in 1941.
