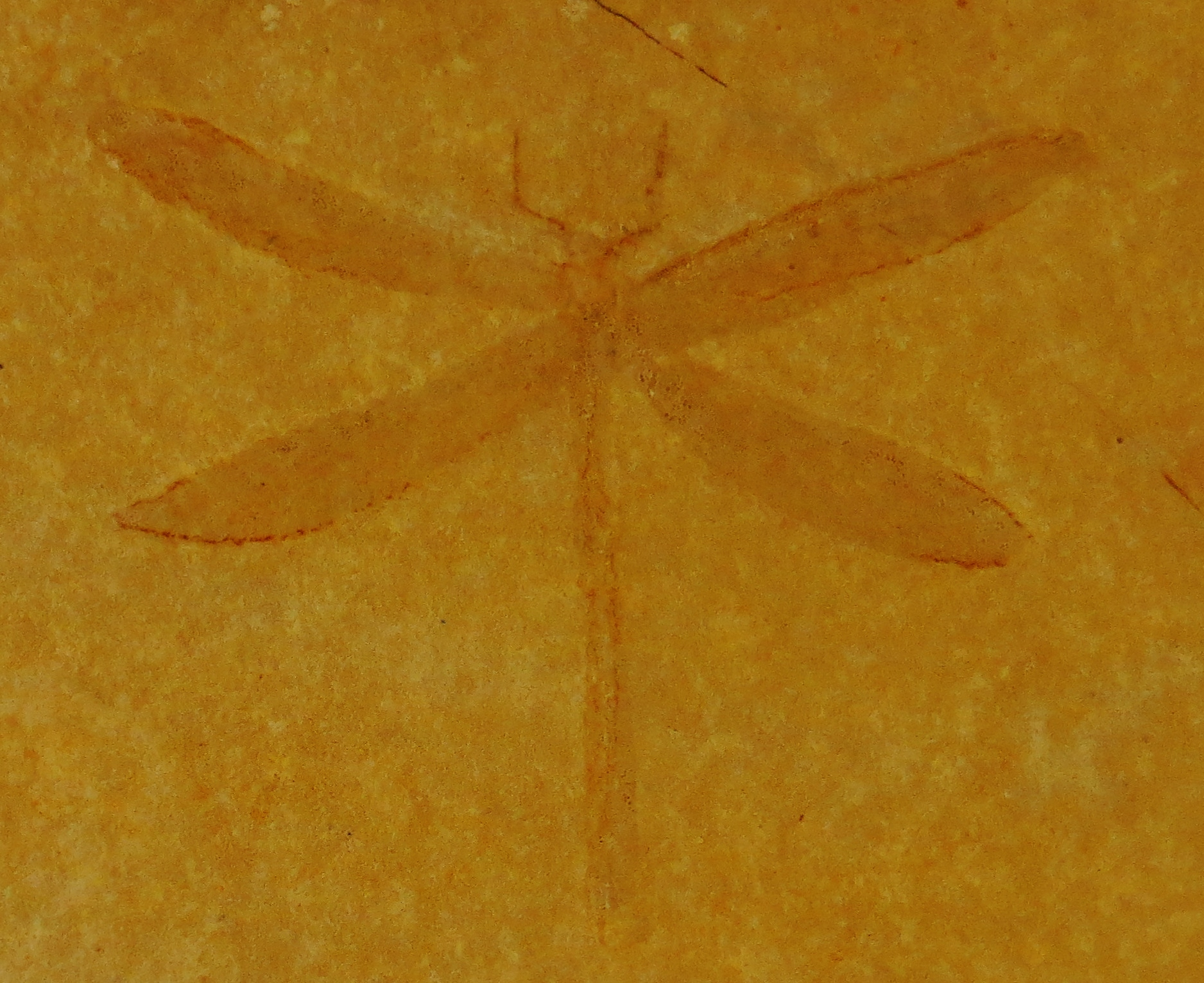
- Steleopteron deichmuelleri (holotype photo)

Scientific classification
- Domain: Eukaryota
- Kingdom: Animalia
- Phylum: Arthropoda
- Class: Insecta
- Order: Odonata
- Suborder: Zygoptera
- Family: †Steleopteridae
- Genus: †Steleopteron
- Species: †S. deichmuelleri

Binomial name
- †Steleopteron deichmuelleri Handlirsch, 1906

= Steleopteron deichmuelleri =

Steleopteron deichmuelleri Temporal range: Upper Jurassic

Extinct species of damselfly

Steleopteron deichmuelleri is a species of extinct winged damselfly in the family Steleopteridae, which lived in modern Germany during the Upper Jurassic era (150.8-145 million years ago).

The holotype 1903.V3 1985/4, which is a dissociated exoskeleton, was found in the Lower Tithonian sediments at Eichstatt, Solnhofen, Bavaria, Germany. The Austrian paleoentomologist Anton Handlirsch described it in 1906.

The body of the holotype reaches 60 mm in length and 3 mm in width, wings – 39 mm in length and 6 mm in width. They were fast insectivorous predators.

The species belongs to the extinct insect family Steleopteridae, and the genus Steleopteron, and is its type species. A sister taxon is Steleopteron cretacicus.
