= Anonychomyrma sellata =

Scientific classification
- Domain: Eukaryota
- Kingdom: Animalia
- Phylum: Arthropoda
- Class: Insecta
- Order: Hymenoptera
- Family: Formicidae
- Subfamily: Dolichoderinae
- Genus: Anonychomyrma
- Species: A. sellata

Binomial name
- Anonychomyrma sellata (Stitz, 1911)

Species of ant

Anonychomyrma sellata is a species of ant in the genus Anonychomyrma. Described by Hermann Stitz in 1911, the species is endemic to New Guinea.
