= Anonychomyrma purpurescens =

Scientific classification
- Kingdom: Animalia
- Phylum: Arthropoda
- Class: Insecta
- Order: Hymenoptera
- Family: Formicidae
- Subfamily: Dolichoderinae
- Genus: Anonychomyrma
- Species: A. purpurescens

Binomial name
- Anonychomyrma purpurescens (Lowne, 1865)

Species of ant

Anonychomyrma purpurescens is a species of ant in the genus Anonychomyrma. Described by Lowne in 1865, the species is endemic to Australia.
