= Anonychomyrma polita =

Scientific classification
- Kingdom: Animalia
- Phylum: Arthropoda
- Clade: Pancrustacea
- Class: Insecta
- Order: Hymenoptera
- Family: Formicidae
- Subfamily: Dolichoderinae
- Genus: Anonychomyrma
- Species: A. polita

Binomial name
- Anonychomyrma polita (Stitz, 1912)

Species of insect

Anonychomyrma polita is a species of ant in the genus Anonychomyrma. Described by Stitz in 1912, the species is endemic to Indonesia.
