= Anonychomyrma itinerans =

Scientific classification
- Kingdom: Animalia
- Phylum: Arthropoda
- Class: Insecta
- Order: Hymenoptera
- Family: Formicidae
- Subfamily: Dolichoderinae
- Genus: Anonychomyrma
- Species: A. itinerans

Binomial name
- Anonychomyrma itinerans (Lowne, 1865)

Subspecies
- Anonychomyrma itinerans ballaratensis Forel, 1902; Anonychomyrma itinerans depilis Forel, 1902; Anonychomyrma itinerans perthensis Forel, 1902

Species of ant

Anonychomyrma itinerans is a species of ant in the genus Anonychomyrma. Described by Lowne in 1865, the species is endemic to Australia.
