= Anonychomyrma dimorpha =

Scientific classification
- Kingdom: Animalia
- Phylum: Arthropoda
- Class: Insecta
- Order: Hymenoptera
- Family: Formicidae
- Subfamily: Dolichoderinae
- Genus: Anonychomyrma
- Species: A. dimorpha

Binomial name
- Anonychomyrma dimorpha (Viehmeyer, 1912)

Subspecies
- Anonychomyrma dimorpha contenta Viehmeyer, 1913

Species of ant

Anonychomyrma dimorpha is a species of ant in the genus Anonychomyrma. Described by Viehmeyer in 1912, the species is endemic to New Guinea and the Solomon Islands.
