= Anonychomyrma angusta =

Scientific classification
- Domain: Eukaryota
- Kingdom: Animalia
- Phylum: Arthropoda
- Class: Insecta
- Order: Hymenoptera
- Family: Formicidae
- Subfamily: Dolichoderinae
- Genus: Anonychomyrma
- Species: A. angusta

Binomial name
- Anonychomyrma angusta (Stitz, 1911)

Species of ant

Anonychomyrma angusta is a species of ant in the genus Anonychomyrma. Described by Stitz in 1911, the species is endemic to New Guinea.
