= Steleopteron cretacicus =

Steleopteron cretacicus Temporal range: early Cretaceous

Scientific classification
- Kingdom: Animalia
- Phylum: Arthropoda
- Class: Insecta
- Order: Odonata
- Suborder: Zygoptera
- Family: †Steleopteridae
- Genus: †Steleopteron
- Species: †S. cretacicus

Binomial name
- †Steleopteron cretacicus Zheng, Nel & Jarzembowski, 2018

Species of damselfly

Steleopteron cretacicus (lat.) is a species of extinct winged damselfly from the Jurassic family Steleopteridae that lived in modern Britain during the Early Cretaceous era (136.4–130 million years ago). It is the first member of the Steleopteridae family, to be found living during the Cretaceous period, to be described, and belongs to the genus Steleopteron. There is a sister taxon – Steleopteron deichmuelleri.

The discovery of the species showed that the family Steleopteridae had not died out by the Cretaceous period. These damselflies were fast insectivorous predators.

The species name refers to the fact that the species existed in the Cretaceous period.

== Holotype ==
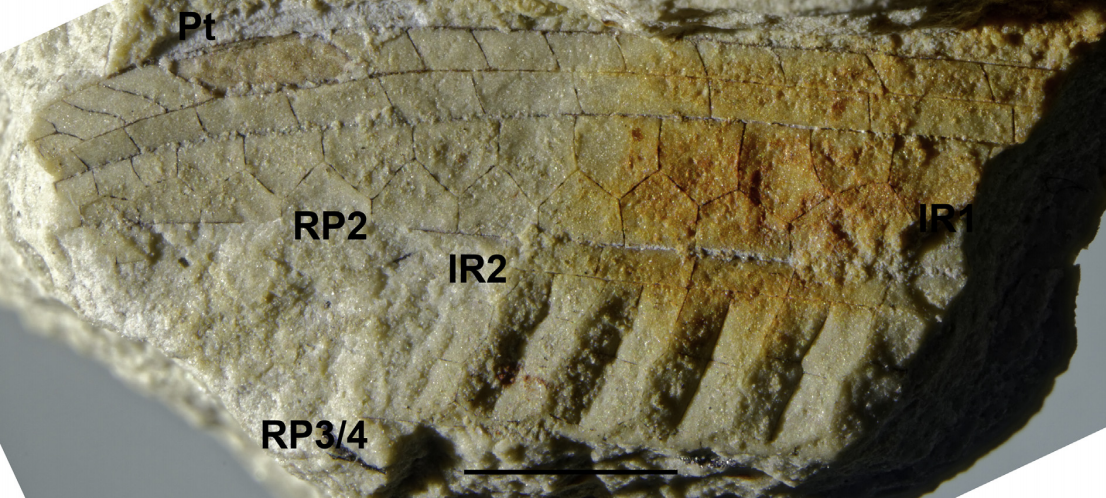
S. cretacicus holotype.

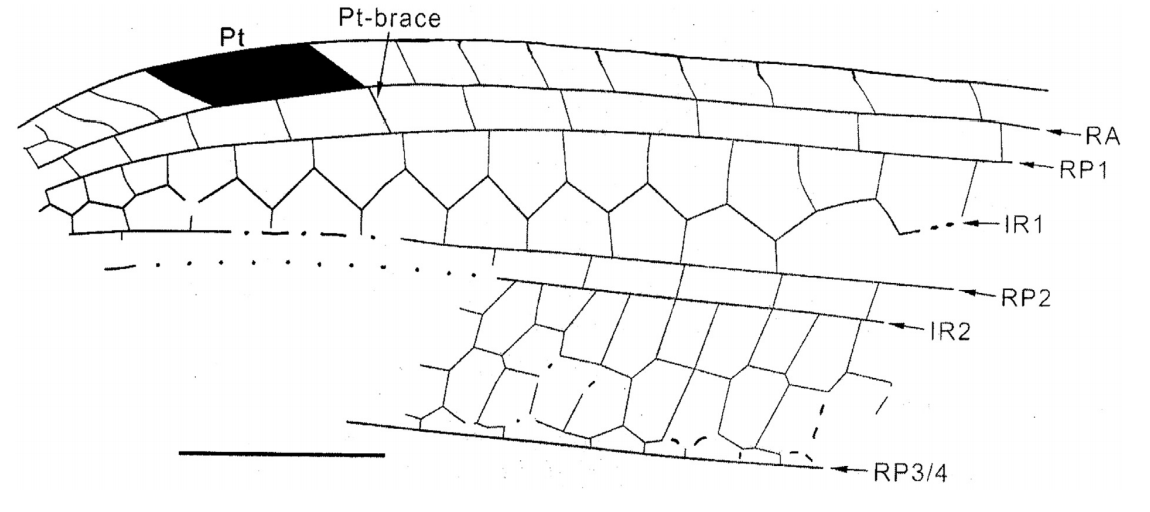
holotype drawing.The scale represents 2 mm.

The holotype, NHMUK CH 879vii, a fossilized wing, was found n lagoonal sediments in the Weald formation (136.4 – 130.0 Ma) in Surrey, United Kingdom. In 2018, Daran Zheng, A. Nel, and Edmund A. Jarzembowski described the species. The specimen is stored in the Department of Earth Sciences, Museum of Natural History London, UK.

The pterostigma of the holotype is 2 mm in length and 0.5 mm in width.
