= Anonychomyrma extensa =

Scientific classification
- Kingdom: Animalia
- Phylum: Arthropoda
- Class: Insecta
- Order: Hymenoptera
- Family: Formicidae
- Subfamily: Dolichoderinae
- Genus: Anonychomyrma
- Species: A. extensa

Binomial name
- Anonychomyrma extensa (Emery, 1887)

Species of ant

Anonychomyrma extensa is a species of ant in the genus Anonychomyrma. Described by Emery in 1887, the species may be endemic to Indonesia and New Guinea, as its exact location remains unknown.
