= Anonychomyrma malandana =

Scientific classification
- Kingdom: Animalia
- Phylum: Arthropoda
- Class: Insecta
- Order: Hymenoptera
- Family: Formicidae
- Subfamily: Dolichoderinae
- Genus: Anonychomyrma
- Species: A. malandana

Binomial name
- Anonychomyrma malandana (Forel, 1915)

Species of ant in Australia

Anonychomyrma malandana is a species of ant in the genus Anonychomyrma. Described by Forel in 1915, the species is endemic to Australia. The name comes from being initially discovered in Malanda on the Atherton Uplands, and they're also found in Windsor and Carbine.

== Description ==
A. malandana is a glossy species characterized by a rounded head and unusually elongated antennal scapes.
