= Anonychomyrma longiceps =

Scientific classification
- Kingdom: Animalia
- Phylum: Arthropoda
- Class: Insecta
- Order: Hymenoptera
- Family: Formicidae
- Subfamily: Dolichoderinae
- Genus: Anonychomyrma
- Species: A. longiceps

Binomial name
- Anonychomyrma longiceps (Forel, 1907)

Species of ant

Anonychomyrma longiceps is a species of ant in the genus Anonychomyrma. Described by Forel in 1907, the species is endemic to Australia.
