= Anonychomyrma scrutator =

Scientific classification
- Domain: Eukaryota
- Kingdom: Animalia
- Phylum: Arthropoda
- Class: Insecta
- Order: Hymenoptera
- Family: Formicidae
- Subfamily: Dolichoderinae
- Genus: Anonychomyrma
- Species: A. scrutator

Binomial name
- Anonychomyrma scrutator (Smith, F., 1859)

Subspecies
- Anonychomyrma scrutator batesi Forel, 1911

Species of ant

Anonychomyrma scrutator is a species of ant in the genus Anonychomyrma. Described by Smith in 1859, the species is endemic to Asia.
