= Anonychomyrma tigris =

Scientific classification
- Domain: Eukaryota
- Kingdom: Animalia
- Phylum: Arthropoda
- Class: Insecta
- Order: Hymenoptera
- Family: Formicidae
- Subfamily: Dolichoderinae
- Genus: Anonychomyrma
- Species: A. tigris

Binomial name
- Anonychomyrma tigris (Stitz, 1912)

Species of insect

Anonychomyrma tigris is a species of ant in the genus Anonychomyrma. Described by Stitz in 1912, the species is endemic to New Guinea.
