= Christoph Schröder =

German biologist and entomologist

Christoph Wilhelm Marcus Schröder (born 1871) was a German biologist and entomologist. He was a professor in Berlin.

== Publications ==
Selected

- with Otto Schmiedeknecht, Jean-Jacques Kieffer, Heinrich Friese, Hermann Stitz and Eduard Enslin, Die insekten Mitteleuropas insbesondere Deutschlands. Stuttgart: Franckhsche verlagshandlung, 1914-[1926]
- Handbuch der entomologie, Jena: Gustav Fischer, [1912]-1929 BHL
- Handbuch für Naturfreunde, Vol. 1 and 2, Kosmos-Frankch, [1910], 1912
