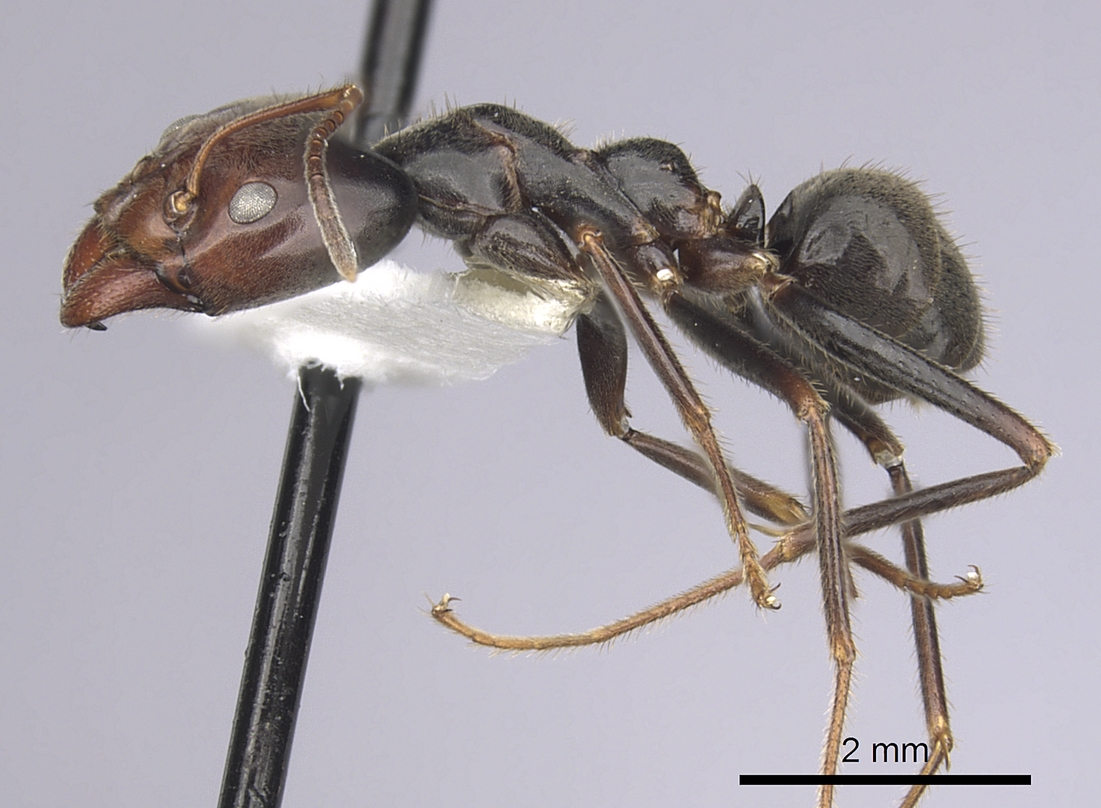

Scientific classification
- Domain: Eukaryota
- Kingdom: Animalia
- Phylum: Arthropoda
- Class: Insecta
- Order: Hymenoptera
- Family: Formicidae
- Subfamily: Dolichoderinae
- Genus: Anonychomyrma
- Species: A. anguliceps

Binomial name
- Anonychomyrma anguliceps (Forel, 1901)

= Anonychomyrma anguliceps =

Species of ant

Anonychomyrma anguliceps is a species of ant in the genus Anonychomyrma. Described by Forel in 1901, the species is endemic to New Guinea.
