= Anonychomyrma froggatti =

Scientific classification
- Kingdom: Animalia
- Phylum: Arthropoda
- Class: Insecta
- Order: Hymenoptera
- Family: Formicidae
- Subfamily: Dolichoderinae
- Genus: Anonychomyrma
- Species: A. froggatti

Binomial name
- Anonychomyrma froggatti (Forel, 1902)

Species of ant

Anonychomyrma froggatti is a species of ant in the genus Anonychomyrma. Described by Forel in 1902, the species is endemic to Australia.
