= Anthony Adrian Allen =

British entomologist

- Born: 1 July 1913
- Died: 23 June 2010 (aged 96)
- Scientific career
- Fields: Entomology

Anthony Adrian Allen (1 July 1913 – 23 June 2010) was a British entomologist who published several hundred scientific papers, in particular on the Coleoptera (beetles) of the British Isles. He was active for much of the middle and late 20th century. He formed a bridge between the great entomologists of last century, and the present generation, many of whom benefitted from his knowledge and guidance.

== Introduction ==
Anthony Adrian Allen, almost universally known as A.A. Allen, was an entomologist specialising in the beetles (Coleoptera) of the British Isles. He has been described as 'one of the best known British coleopterists'. He was a pupil and friend of several prominent late 19th-early 20th century entomologists, including Horace Donisthorpe and Phillip Harwood.

== Faunistic work ==
Allen is perhaps best known for his work on the British beetle fauna, which includes more than 4,000 species. During his career he published hundreds of papers and scientific notes on the subject, mostly in the Entomologist's Monthly Magazine. He had a subsidiary interest in the British fauna of flies Diptera and true bugs Hemiptera, on which he also published.

== Taxonomic work ==
Allen was one of the few 20th century British faunists to describe new species to science from the British Isles. Over a 62 year period Allen described 13 new species of beetle, of which four remain valid. The apparently high rate of synonymy of his species results from the fact he was primarily dealing with taxonomically difficult groups of beetles. The four valid species described by Allen are:

Staphylinidae:

Aleochara phycophila Allen 1937

Acrotona benicki (Allen 1940)

Scraptiidae:

Scraptia testacea Allen 1940

Chrysomelidae:

Longitarsus fowleri Allen 1967

As may be expected for species that remained undiscovered until the mid 20th century, all four valid species described by A.A. Allen are uncommon, and are given conservation status. Longitarsus fowleri is the most widespread of the four, being associated with teasel on chalk downland in southern Britain. Scraptia testacea is regarded as an indicator species of good quality ancient woodland and parkland. Since their description, three of the species have been found in other European countries but the rove beetle Aleochara phycophila, a parasitoid of seaweed-flies from the south coast of England, is still known only from the type specimen and has never been recorded again.

Longitarsus fowleri is named in honour of Coleopterist William Weekes Fowler.

== Honorifics ==
Allen received the rare accolade of having two British beetle species named by colleagues in his honour, the ground-living weevil Trachyphloeus alleni Donisthorpe, 1948 and the latridiid plaster beetle Corticaria alleni Johnson, 1974. However, the former, named by the myrmecologist and coleopterist Horace Donisthorpe, was later placed in synonymy with the widespread Trachyphloeus asperatus Boheman, 1843.

== Collection ==
A.A. Allen's almost comprehensive collection of British Beetles, including most of his type specimens, was presented to the Natural History Museum, London in October 2010. The Museum intends to digitally scan the 38 drawers, and make them available as high resolution images on the internet "as a scientific resource, and as a permanent record of A.A. Allen’s immense contribution to the understanding of the British Coleoptera". The whereabouts of his collections of other orders, if they still exist, is unknown.
