= Anonychomyrma fornicata =

Scientific classification
- Kingdom: Animalia
- Phylum: Arthropoda
- Class: Insecta
- Order: Hymenoptera
- Family: Formicidae
- Subfamily: Dolichoderinae
- Genus: Anonychomyrma
- Species: A. fornicata

Binomial name
- Anonychomyrma fornicata (Emery, 1914)

Species of ant

Anonychomyrma fornicata is a species of ant in the genus Anonychomyrma. Described by Emery in 1914, the species is endemic to Australia.
