= Matley Bog =

Bog in Hampshire, England

Coordinates: 50.8632°N 1.5262°W

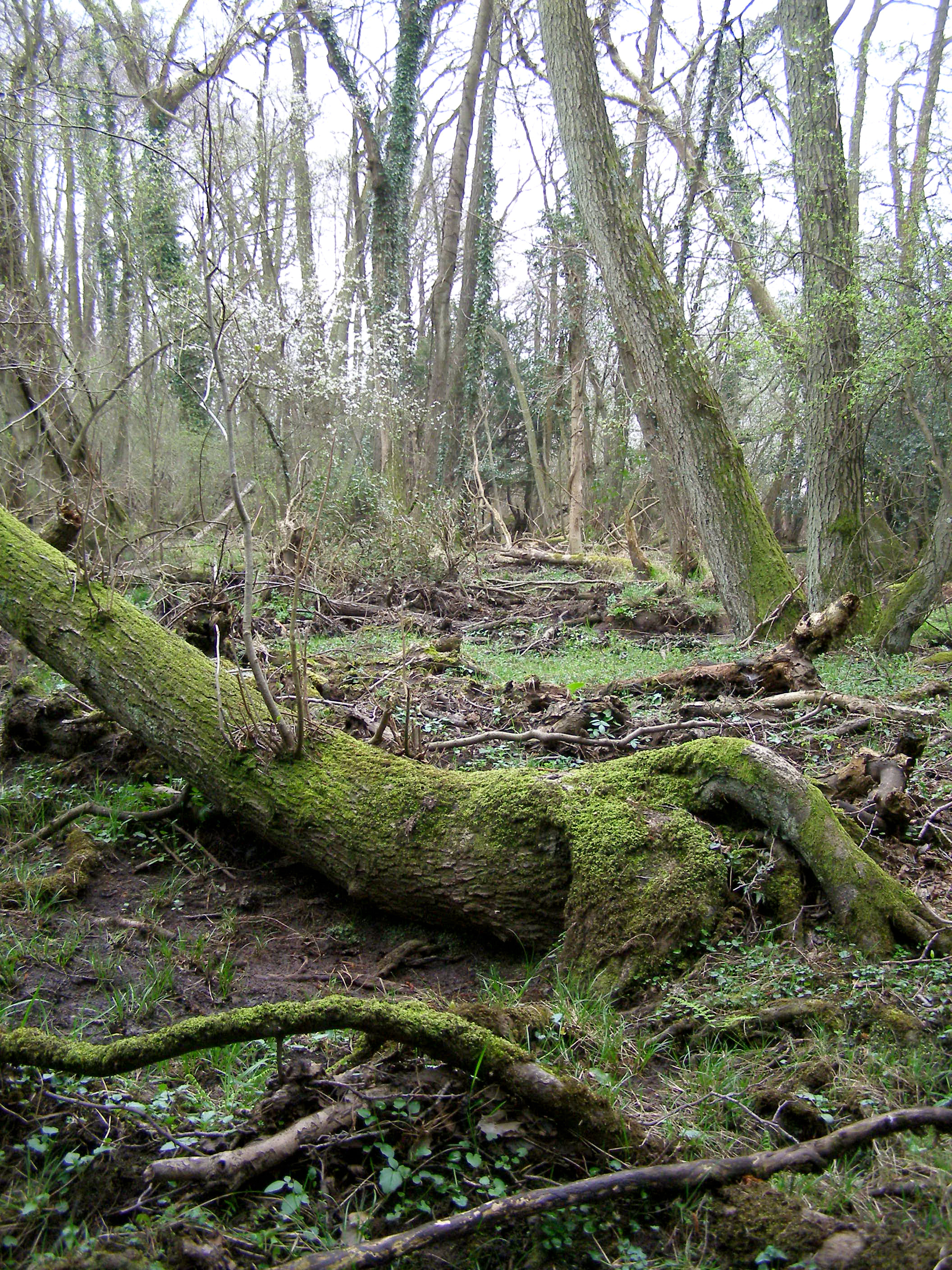
Alder carr at Matley Bog

Matley Bog is an ancient woodland bog in the New Forest, Hampshire, England.

== Geography ==
It is a sphagnum quaking bog with adjacent heather heathland. The stream that runs axially through the bog drains at its eastern end into the infant Beaulieu River.

== Biodiversity ==
It is notable for the presence of the rare ant Formica candida, sometimes called the shining bog ant, which was discovered there in the early 20th century by Horace Donisthorpe. The wetter areas contain the large marsh grasshopper and the rare and diminutive bog orchid, Hammarbya paludosa.

It is also home to a large population of raft spiders as well as the crab spider Thomisus onustus.
