= Anonychomyrma incisa =

Scientific classification
- Domain: Eukaryota
- Kingdom: Animalia
- Phylum: Arthropoda
- Class: Insecta
- Order: Hymenoptera
- Family: Formicidae
- Subfamily: Dolichoderinae
- Genus: Anonychomyrma
- Species: A. incisa

Binomial name
- Anonychomyrma incisa (Stitz, 1932)

Species of ant

Anonychomyrma incisa is a species of ant in the genus Anonychomyrma. Described by Stitz in 1932, the species is endemic to Indonesia.
