= Anonychomyrma procidua =

Scientific classification
- Kingdom: Animalia
- Phylum: Arthropoda
- Class: Insecta
- Order: Hymenoptera
- Family: Formicidae
- Subfamily: Dolichoderinae
- Genus: Anonychomyrma
- Species: A. procidua

Binomial name
- Anonychomyrma procidua (Erichson, 1842)

Species of ant

Anonychomyrma procidua is a species of ant in the genus Anonychomyrma. Described by Wilhelm Ferdinand Erichson in 1842, the species is endemic to Australia.
