= Derek Wragge Morley =

Basil Derek Wragge Morley (1920 – 22 January 1969) born in Cambridge, son of a clergyman. He was most noted for his work on the study of ants. He was an independent scientific consultant, who also held posts in journalism throughout his working life. He died aged 49 as a result of numerous illnesses.

== Scientific study and works ==
Throughout his working life, Derek Wragge Morley held positions related to his knowledge of the sciences and devoted his life's work largely to the study of ants, for which he is perhaps best known.

=== Ants and the academic ===
Derek Wragge Morley began his study of ants when he was 14. When he was 16, he published his first paper on ant research. A year after this, he read two papers to the International Congress for Entomology at Berlin, chairing one of the sessions. He studied natural sciences at the University of Cambridge. For eight years, he held the Strong Fellowship for philosophical and scientific research, and from 1946 to 1949, he held the Macaulay Fellowship for Genetical Research at the University of Edinburgh. In 1948, he was an invitation lecturer at the Institute for Social Anthropology at the University of Oxford. His research included genetics, social behaviour of animals, and the behaviour of agricultural pests. During the Second World War he investigated insect pests for the Ministry of Agriculture.

=== Later posts ===
Derek Wragge Morley also served as Scientific Editor for both Picture Post Magazine and the Financial Times, as well as acting as a consultant for films on scientific subjects and the application of the new sciences of his day in industry, including work on early computers.

Morley's first marriage was to Irina Platonov in 1943, with whom he had two children. The couple later divorced, and he went on to marry Monica Strutt in 1952, and together they had four children. He died on 22 January 1969 at his home in Hadleigh, Suffolk.

== Books and films ==
Morley wrote several books on ants, including The Ant World, first published by Pelican in 1953. He also produced a film on the subject, Ant Warfare. There is a Pathé film of him at home in Hampstead, working on ant research.

He wrote a book about computing machines, entitled "Automatic Data Processing", which was published in 1961 by Her Majesty's Stationery Office for the Department of Scientific and Industrial Research, and acted as a scientific consultant to a film about the application of computers in industry and the pros and cons of installing such systems, entitled "This Automaton Age".

His book Ants (1953), written for the New Naturalist monograph series, was dedicated to his mentor, Horace Donisthorpe.
