= Anonychomyrma arcadia =

Scientific classification
- Kingdom: Animalia
- Phylum: Arthropoda
- Class: Insecta
- Order: Hymenoptera
- Family: Formicidae
- Subfamily: Dolichoderinae
- Genus: Anonychomyrma
- Species: A. arcadia

Binomial name
- Anonychomyrma arcadia (Forel, 1915)

Species of ant

Anonychomyrma arcadia is a species of ant in the genus Anonychomyrma. Described by Forel in 1915, the species is endemic to Australia.
