= Hermann Stitz =

German biologist and entomologist

Hermann Stitz (24 December 1868 – 6 February 1947) was a German biologist and entomologist. He was a specialist in Hymenoptera especially ants and Neuroptera. He worked mainly on the collections of the Berlin Museum für Naturkunde der Humboldt-Universität including insects collected on the German Central Africa Expedition 1910-11, and the German-Soviet Alay-Pamir Expedition of 1928

== Publications ==
Selected

- Stitz H., 1909 Zur Kenntnis des Genitalapparats der Neuropteren. Zoologische Jahrbücher. Abteilung für Anatomie und Ontogenie der Tiere 27: 377–448. pdf]
- Hermann Stitz, 1912 Ameisen aus Ceram und Neu-Guinea. Sitzungsberichte der Gesellschaft Naturforschender Freunde zu Berlin – 1912: 498 - 514.pdf
- 1914-[26]. with Otto Schmiedeknecht, Jean-Jacques Kieffer, Heinrich Friese, Christoph Wilhelm Marcus Schroder and Eduard Enslin Die insekten Mitteleuropas insbesondere Deutschlands. Stuttgart, Franckhsche verlagshandlung
- Stitz, H. 1927. Ordnung: Netzflügler, Neuróptera. Pp. XIV,1 - XIV, 24 in Brohmer, P.; Ehrmann, P.; Ulmer, U. (eds.). Die Tierwelt Mitteleuropas. Band VI [=6] (Insekten), Teil 3, Lieferung 1 (Neuróptera, Trichóptera). Quelle and Meyer, Leipzig.
- Stitz, H. (Hermann), 1932. The Norwegian Zoological Expedition to the Galapagos Islands 1925, conducted by Alf Wollebaik. 5. Formicidae. Meddelelser fra det Zoologiske Museum Oslo, 31: 367–372.
- Hermann Stitz, 1939. Die Tierwelt Deutschlands und der angrenzenden Meersteile nach ihren Merkmalen und nach ihrer Lebensweise. 37. Theil. Hautflüger oder Hymenoptera. I: Ameisen oder Formicidae. Jena: G. Fischer, 428 pp.
