= Anonychomyrma glabrata =

Scientific classification
- Domain: Eukaryota
- Kingdom: Animalia
- Phylum: Arthropoda
- Class: Insecta
- Order: Hymenoptera
- Family: Formicidae
- Subfamily: Dolichoderinae
- Genus: Anonychomyrma
- Species: A. glabrata

Binomial name
- Anonychomyrma glabrata (Smith, F., 1857)

Species of ant

Anonychomyrma gigantea is a species of ant in the genus Anonychomyrma. Described by Smith in 1857, the species is endemic to Malaysia.
