= Anonychomyrma biconvexa =

Scientific classification
- Kingdom: Animalia
- Phylum: Arthropoda
- Class: Insecta
- Order: Hymenoptera
- Family: Formicidae
- Subfamily: Dolichoderinae
- Genus: Anonychomyrma
- Species: A. biconvexa

Binomial name
- Anonychomyrma biconvexa (Santschi, 1928)

Synonyms
- Iridomyrmex foetans Clark, 1929

Species of ant

Anonychomyrma biconvexa is a species of ant in the genus Anonychomyrma. Described by Santschi in 1928, the species is endemic to Australia.
