= Anton Handlirsch =

Austrian entomologist (1865–1935)

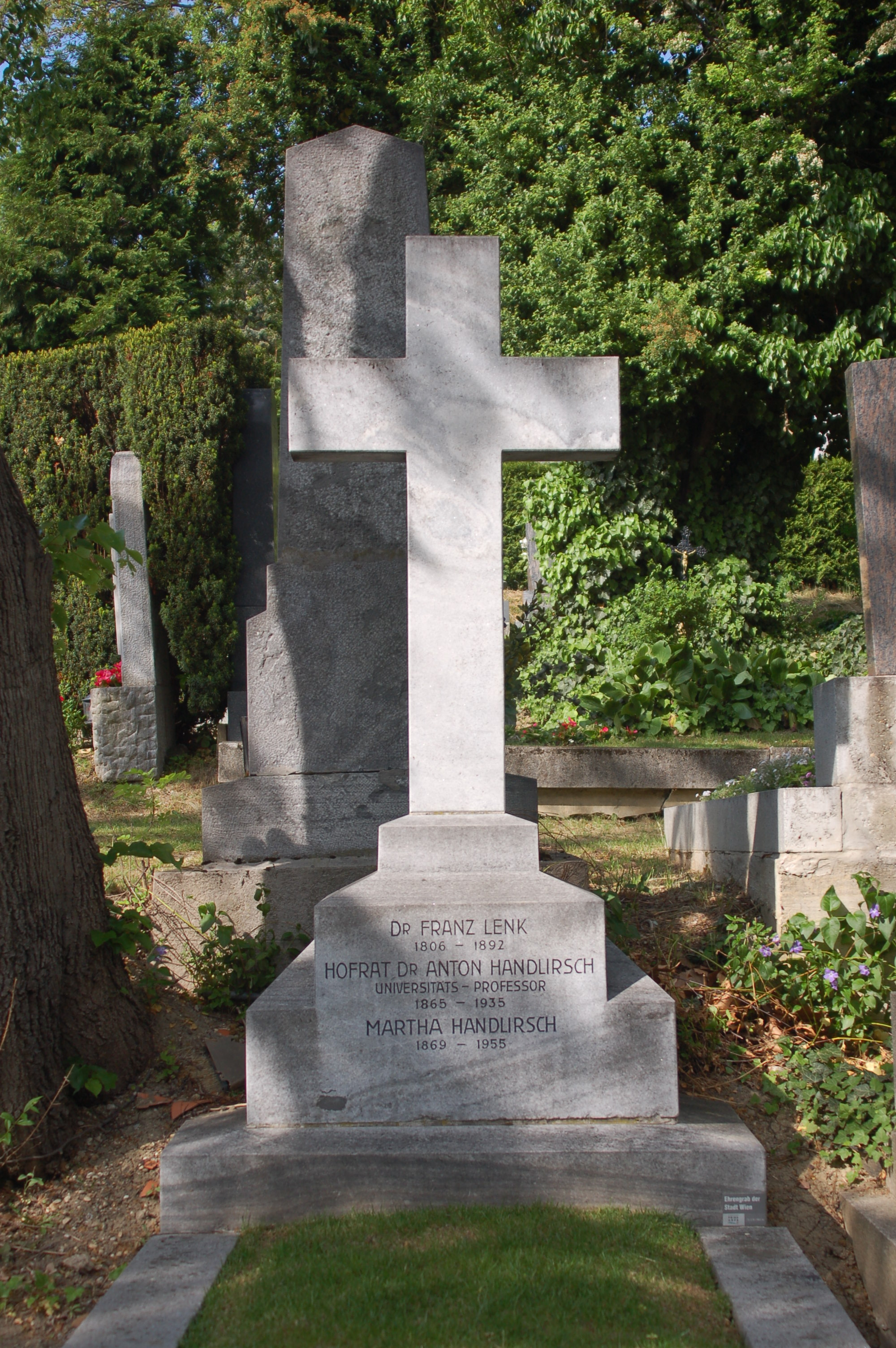
Dornbacher Friedhof - Anton Handlirsch

Anton Peter Josef Handlirsch (20 January 1865, Vienna – 28 August 1935, Vienna) was an Austrian entomologist. He worked on many groups including Hemiptera, Hymenoptera and Neuroptera. His most significant work was in the study of fossil insects.

Anton was born to Peter (1831–1873) and Rosina Handlirsch (born 1841). His father worked as a cook of the Schwarzenberg family. His surname Handlirsch came from Czech: handlíř "merchant". He went to study at the Gymnasium in Vienna in 1875. Although he began to show an interest in zoology, his father wished that he obtain a degree in pharmacy. Anton obtained a master's degree in pharmacy in 1885. After working for a while as a pharmacist, Anton and his brother Adam met the entomologist Friedrich Moritz Brauer and Anton later became an assistant to him in the department of entomology of the Natural History Museum of Vienna in 1892. In the same year, he married Martha Allounek. He became the director of this department in 1922, a function which he held until his retirement. He specialised in the Hymenoptera and the Hemiptera, his work concerning the evolution of these and other insects. His principal work, which appeared between 1906 and 1908, was on insect fossils and he was the founder of insect palaeontology. The University of Graz gave him the title of Doctor of Science honoris causa and he was made a member of the Academy of Science of Vienna. He is best known for Die Fossilen Insekten (1906–1908) – 1,433 pages and 51 plates – and his contributions to the third volume of Christoph Schröder's Handbuch der Entomologie (1920–1925) – 1,201 pages with 1,040 figures.

Handlirsch's fossil collection is mostly in the Naturhistorisches Museum in Vienna. Other parts are in the Ernst-Moritz-Universität in Greifswald.

== Sources ==
- Nonveiller, Guido (2001). Pioneers of the Research on the Insects of Dalmatia. Zagreb: Croatian Natural History Museum. pp. 1–390.
- Evenhuis, N. L. (1997). Litteratura taxonomica dipterorum (1758-1930). Leiden: Backhuys.
