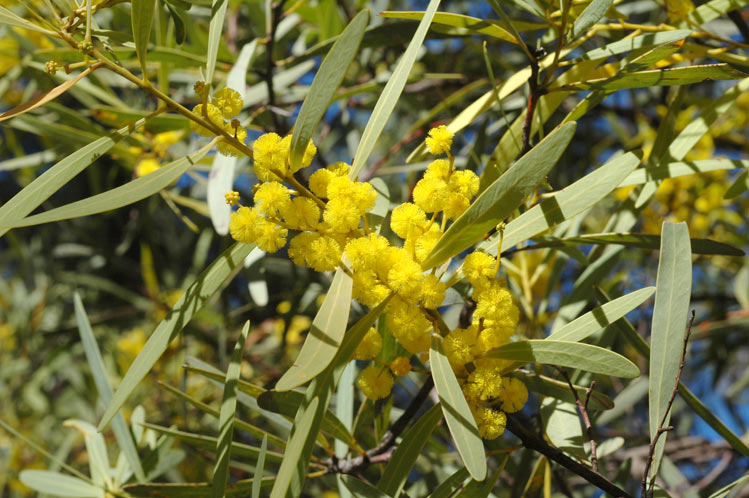
- In the Australian National Botanic Gardens

Scientific classification
- Kingdom: Plantae
- Clade: Tracheophytes
- Clade: Angiosperms
- Clade: Eudicots
- Clade: Rosids
- Order: Fabales
- Family: Fabaceae
- Subfamily: Caesalpinioideae
- Clade: Mimosoid clade
- Genus: Acacia
- Species: A. obtusata

Binomial name
- Acacia obtusata Sieber ex. DC.
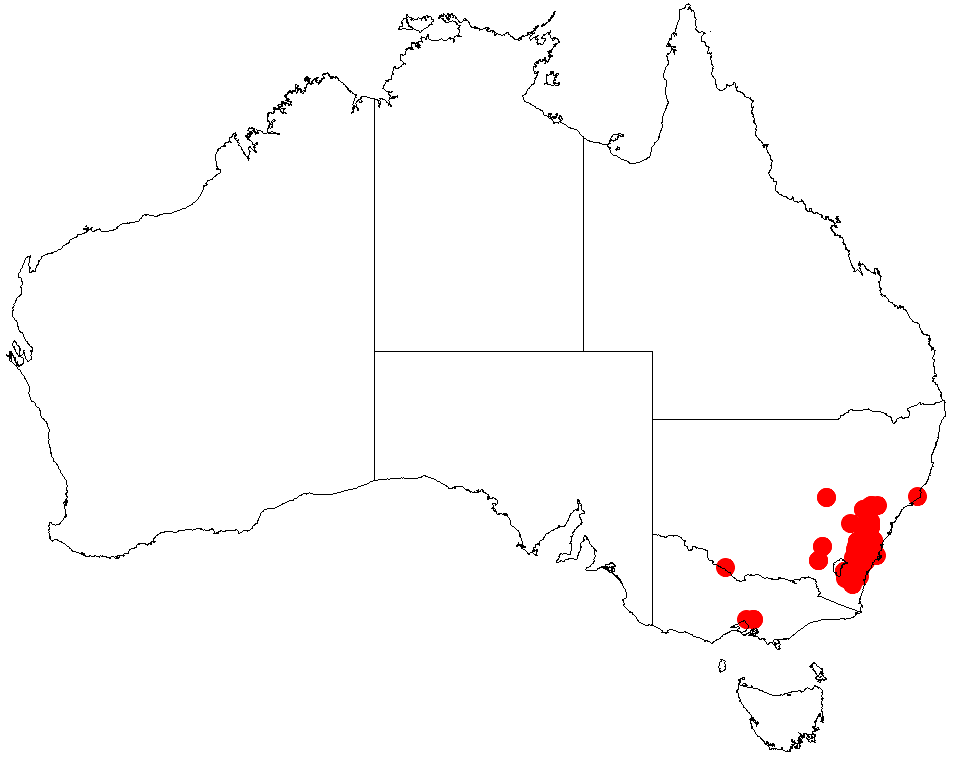
- Occurrence data from AVH

Synonyms
- Acacia obtusata Sieber ex DC. var. obtusata; Acacia obtusatum Pedley orth. var.; Racosperma obtusatum (Sieber ex DC.) Pedley

= Acacia obtusata =

Blunt-leaf wattle

Species of legume

Acacia obtusata, commonly known as blunt-leaf wattle or obtuse wattle, is a species of flowering plant in the family Fabaceae, and is endemic to New South Wales, Australia. It is a spindly shrub with glabrous, dark reddish branchlets, leathery, lance-shaped phyllodes with the narrower end towards the base, spherical heads of golden yellow flowers and leathery, blackish pods.

== Description ==
Acacia obtusata is a spindly shrub that typically grows to a height of up to 2.5 m (8 ft 2 in) and has glabrous, dark reddish branchlets. Its phyllodes are lance-shaped to narrowly lance-shaped with the narrower end towards the base, 40–110 mm (1.6–4.3 in) long, 5–16 mm (0.20–0.63 in) wide, leathery, lightly glaucous with a rather prominent midrib and marginal veins, and a gland 5–40 mm (0.20–1.57 in) above the pulvinus. The flowers are arranged in five to fourteen spherical heads in racemes 15–45 mm (0.59–1.77 in) long, on stout, glabrous peduncles 3–6 mm (0.12–0.24 in) long. Each head has 15 to 27 golden yellow flowers. Flowering occurs from July to October, and the pods are more or less straight and leathery, up to 100 mm (3.9 in) long, 7–12 mm (0.28–0.47 in) wide, glabrous and blackish. The seeds are oblong to elliptic, about 5 mm (0.20 in) long and dull black with a club-shaped aril.

== Taxonomy ==
Acacia obtusata was first formally described in 1825 by Augustin Pyramus de Candolle in his Prodromus Systematis Naturalis Regni Vegetabilis from an unpublished description by Franz Sieber. The specific epithet (obtusata) means 'obtuse' and refers to the shape of the phyllodes.

== Distribution and habitat ==
Blunt-leaf wattle grows in sand in forest on the tablelands from the Budawang Range to near Mount Coricudgy and south to near Tumut. It is common in the western Blue Mountains.

== See also ==
- List of Acacia species
