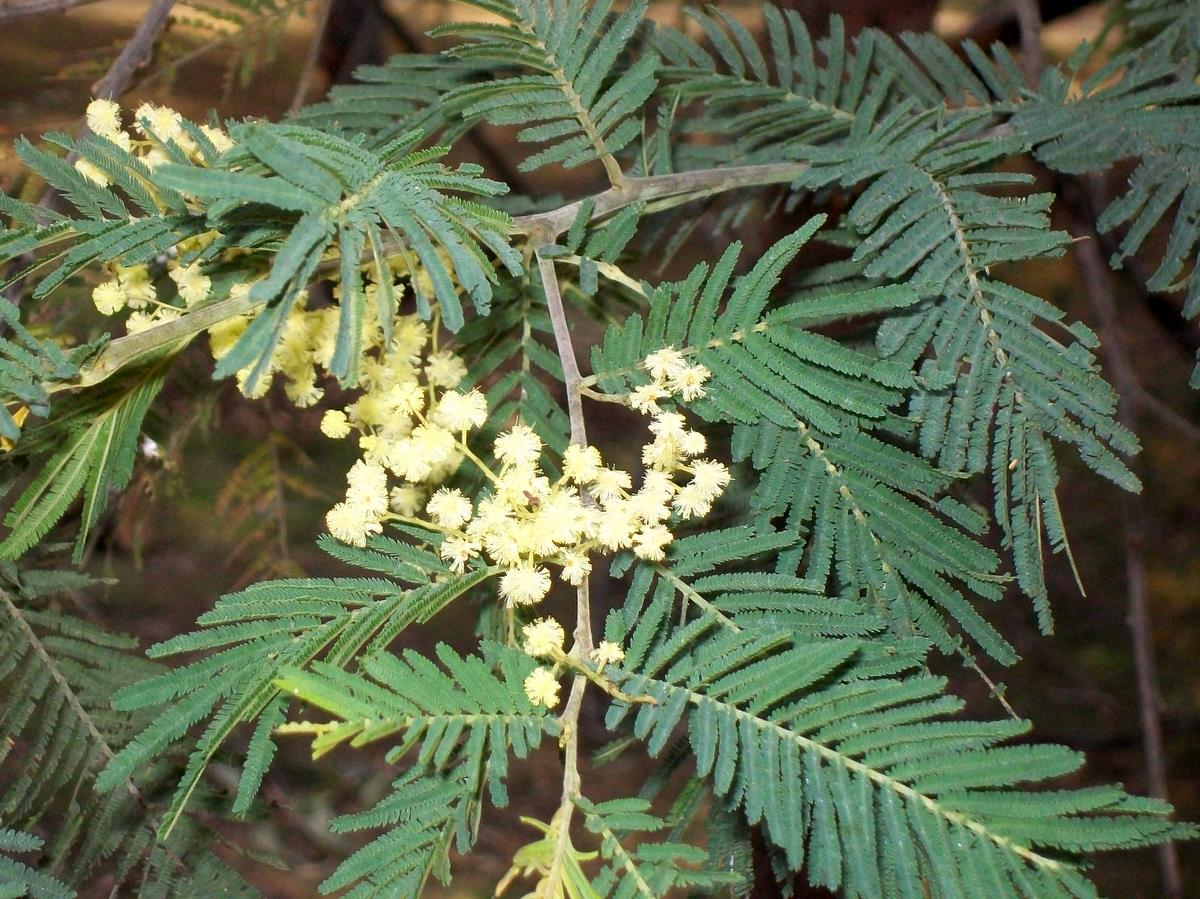
- Near Batemans Bay

Scientific classification
- Kingdom: Plantae
- Clade: Tracheophytes
- Clade: Angiosperms
- Clade: Eudicots
- Clade: Rosids
- Order: Fabales
- Family: Fabaceae
- Subfamily: Caesalpinioideae
- Clade: Mimosoid clade
- Genus: Acacia
- Species: A. trachyphloia

Binomial name
- Acacia trachyphloia Tindale
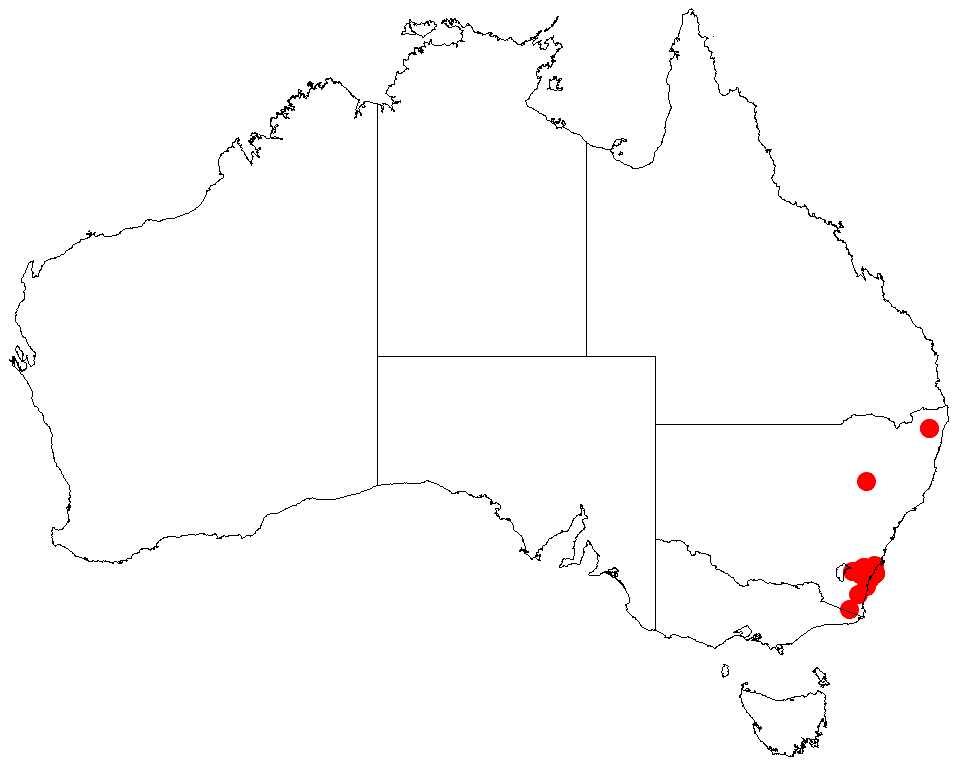
- Occurrence data from AVH

= Acacia trachyphloia =

Bodalla wattle

Species of legume

Acacia trachyphloia is a tree native to southeastern Australia. Common names include Bodalla wattle and golden feather wattle. The specific epithet trachyphloia refers to the rough bark.

It grows from 4 to 18 metres tall, and is found beside streams and other moist areas between Lake Conjola and Bodalla in the south coast region and nearby tablelands of New South Wales. A number of different eucalyptus trees are found nearby. As with many of the acacias, it forms attractive yellow flowers between July and October.
