= Guido Nonveiller =

Croatian entomologist (1913–2002)

- Born: 5 June 1913; Rijeka, Croatia
- Died: 7 April 2002 (aged 88); Belgrade, Serbia
- Scientific career
- Fields: Entomology
- Workplaces: International Brigades, Fao, Ordre des Palmes Académiques

Guido Nonveiller (5 June 1913, Rijeka – 7 April 2002, Belgrade ) was a Croatian entomologist, FAO expert and professor at the University of Belgrade. He fought in the International Brigades and French Forces of the Interior during World War II. In 1989 he was inducted as a Commander of the l'Ordre des Palmes Académiques. He was known for his political and scientific activism and perhaps as the world authority for the African and Palaearctic Mutillidae (velvet ants).

== Life ==
His father Lino Nonveiller was a chemical engineer that travelled through Europe and educated Guido and his sister in Rijeka, Vienna and Split. In 1927, he was introduced to Peter Novak, an early Croatian entomologist, who made a lasting impact on the young boy and stimulated a lifelong passion for insects. At sixteen (1929) he discovered his first new insect species on Biokovo mountains. The same year it was named after him – Trechus nonveilleri by Giuseppe Miller from Trieste.

In his early twenties, during probation work at the University of Belgrade, he engaged in different students movements that led him to fight in the Spanish Civil War and World War II. He was an officer in the International Brigades from 1937 until he was captured after Franco's victory in April 1939 and incarcerated in the prison of Castres. He escaped in 1942 with 36 other Brigadists and joined the French Resistance. After the war from 1944 to 1945, he was appointed at the Yugoslav Embassy in France.

In 1945, he returned to the University of Belgrade, where he taught from 1946 to 1960. He founded and directed for ten years the Federal Institute for Plant Protection of Yugoslavia. He also held a head of the Plant Protection Services and the Yugoslav Federal Ministry from 1947 to 1949. From 1960 to 1962 he worked in Tunisia as plant protection officer, and from 1962 to 1985 as United Nations Food and Agriculture Organization expert in Yaounde, Cameroon.

In 1989 he was inducted as a Commander of the l'Ordre des Palmes Académiques, the highest level of the academic honor given out by the French government. From 1992 to 1996, in his early eighties, he moved to Paris to work at the Muséum national d'histoire naturelle and published over 20 papers on his work on Lepidoptera.

In 1996 the Spanish government recognized his endeavours to defend the Republic and declared him an honorary citizen of Spain. The same year, Jacques Chirac, then French President, granted him the legal status of former service personnel ("anciens combattants").

In 2006 the Croatian Entomological society named their bibliographical database Nonveilleriana in his memory.

== Work ==
Nonveiller was internationally renowned for researching the African and Palaearctic Mutillidae and Bradynobaenidae (Hymenoptera), a leading specialist for several groups of Coleoptera of the Balkans and adjacent areas and a prominent expert in economic entomology and historiography of his time. During his 13-year-long stay in Cameroon he was one of the first proponents of the Integrated pest management.

In the late 1980, despite his age, Nonveiller was among the world pioneers in application of personal computers in entomology. He started with Commodore 64 in 1983.

== Publications ==
Nonveiller wrote and published in German, French, English, Italian, Spanish and Serbo-Croatian, resulting in more than 150 publications, description of 33 new general/subgenera and over 330 new species-group taxa assembling one of the world largest collection of African Mutillidae including more than 120,000 specimens collected by himself and his wife Nadezda in Cameroon.

== Bibliography ==
- Nonveiller, Guido 1984. Catalogue commenté et illustré des insectes du Cameroun d'intérêt agricole / University of Belgrade / Institut pour la protection des plantes
- Nonveiller, G. (1995). Recherches sur les mutillides de l'afrique (hymenoptera, mutillidae).
- Guido Nonveiller (2001). Pioneers of the Research on the Insects of Dalmatia. Croatian Natural History Museum (Zagreb).
- G. Nonveiller (2004) "Memoirs of a 20th century citizen". University of Belgrade
