= Otto Schmiedeknecht =

German entomologist (1847–1936)

H.L. Otto Schmiedeknecht (8 September 1847 Bad Blankenburg, Thüringen- 11 February 1936, Blankenburg) was a German entomologist who specialised in Hymenoptera.

== Selected works ==
- 1902-1936.Opuscula Ichneumonologica. Blankenburg in Thüringen.1902pp.
- 1907.Hymenopteren Mitteleuropas. Gustav Fischer. Jena. 804pp.
- 1914.Die Schlupfwespen (Ichneumonidae) Mitteleuropas, insbesondere deutschlands. In: Schoeder C. "Die Insekten Mitteleuropas". Franckh'sche Verlagshandlung, Stuttgart. pp. 113–170.

== Sources ==
- Stefan Vidal (2005). The history of Hymenopteran parasitoid research in Germany, Biological Control, 32 : 25-33. ISSN 1049-9644
