= Horace Donisthorpe =

British myrmecologist & coleopterist

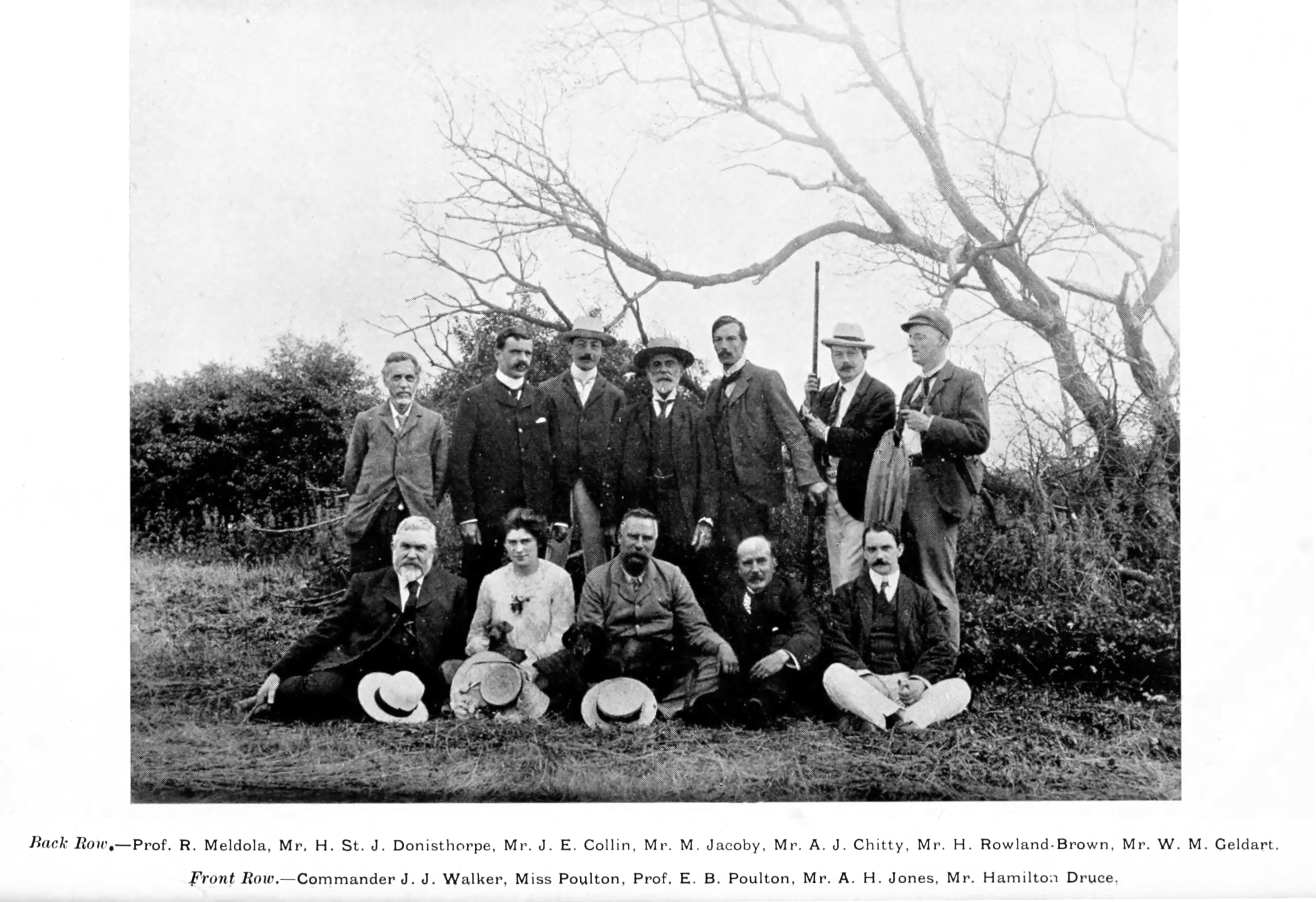
Donisthorpe (standing second from left) in 1904 with other British entomologists

Horace St. John Kelly Donisthorpe (17 March 1870 – 22 April 1951) was an eccentric British myrmecologist and coleopterist, memorable in part for his enthusiastic championing of the renaming of the genus Lasius after him as Donisthorpea, and for his many claims of discovering new species of beetles and ants.

== Biography ==
Educated at Mill Hill House, Leicester, and Oakham School, Donisthorpe went to Heidelberg University to read medicine. However, his "too sensitive nature" forced him to give up this career. Being possessed of a private income, from about 1890 he devoted his life to the study of beetles and ants, publishing more than three hundred papers on ants alone. Derek Wragge Morley says in his obituary of Donisthorpe in Nature, that he related a story of how, when a young man, he had swum across the Rhine at Heidelberg, "a feat which, so it was said, no one had achieved before".

Probably the best known of his collecting grounds were the ancient forests of Windsor Great Park in Berkshire where he had permission to collect extensively and where so many of his important discoveries were made.

During his career he associated with many other prominent British entomologists, including Canon Fowler, with whom he co-authored the last volume of 'Coleoptera of the British Islands, and A. A. Allen.

Donisthorpe was controversial in part because he was often considered overeager in his attempts to describe new species of ants and beetles. For example, he named 24 new species of beetle from Britain (17 named after his colleagues), but 22 have since been deemed to be insufficiently distinct to be considered separate species and have been made synonyms of earlier species. The only two British beetle species that he described which remain valid are the rove beetles:

- Leptacinus intermedius,
- Ilyobates bennetti.

Species which Donisthorpe described anew that turned out to have been previously classified include (from New Species of Ants (Hym., Formicidae) from the Gold Coast, Borneo, Celebes, New Guinea and New Hebrides):

- Aenictus bidentatus,
- Rhytidoponera gagates,
- Diacamma rugosum,
- Leptogenys walkeri (Donisthorpe noted: "I have much pleasure in naming this ant in honour of my dear friend the late Commander J. J. Walker, RN"),
- Leptogenys violacea,
- Polyrhachis bryanti,
- and Polyrhachis hosei.

Polyrhachis hosei provides an interesting demonstration of Donisthorpe's zeal for new species coming into conflict with existing ones. His description starts: "The general description of P.(M.) byyani would do equally well for this species ..." and then goes on to describe a small number of very minor differences: "a larger and more robust insect", "pronotal spines longer", "the scale has a somewhat wider arch", and so on.

Donisthorpe was a fellow of the Zoological Society of London and a fellow and vice-chairman of the Royal Entomological Society. He resided at 58, Kensington Mansions, and was known for his lavish parties, which led to the dissipation of much of his family fortune. He was an associate of Auguste-Henri Forel, with whom he stayed in Switzerland in 1914.

Donisthorpe's extensive and beautifully curated collection of British beetles is housed at the Department of Entomology at the Natural History Museum.

== Books ==
- The Coleoptera of the Isle of Wight. Published in 1906 by the Leicester Literary and Philosophical Society. The supplementary sixth volume was compiled with W. W. Fowler to the latter's Coleoptera of the British Isles in 1913;
- British Ants: their life histories and classification. First published in 1915, this book was reviewed and republished in 1927, and was the first major book ever written on British ants. Although the first edition contained all the species known at the time (and one, Leptothorax corticalis which was later found to be erroneous), the second edition contained the addition of Lasius brunneus, a small, arboreal ants of the Lasius mixtus group found principally in orchards in the home counties. The 1927 edition was, however, too early for any mention of Strongylognathus testaceus, which Donisthorpe discovered (and described as a new species, S. diveri) in the New Forest several years later.

- Davidson, James (1 October 1927). "Reviewed work: British Ants: Their Life History ana Classification. Second Edition, H. St. J. K. Donisthorpe". Science Progress in the Twentieth Century (1919–1933). 22 (86): 350–351. ISSN 2059-4941. JSTOR 43430061.
- Wheeler, W. M. (3 March 1916). "Reviewed work: British Ants, Their Life-History and Classification, H. St. J. K. Donisthorpe". Science. New Series. 43 (1105): 316–318. doi:10.1126/science.43.1105.316-b. ISSN 0036-8075. JSTOR 1639520.

- The Guests of British Ants. Published in 1927, the same year as the revision of British Ants: their life histories and classification took place. This book deals with myrmecophiles of British ants, some of them ants themselves (e.g. Formicoxenus and Anergates). It also mentions and debunks theories regarding the effect that the presence of a species of beetle (of the genus Atemeles) has on the number of pseudogynes in colonies of the larger formica (ant) species.
- An Annotated List of the Additions to the British Coleopterous Fauna. Published in 1931, the title serves to be self-explanatory.
- A Preliminary List of the Coleoptera of Windsor Forest. Published in 1939, Donisthorpe dedicated the book to the memory of Florence Jane Kirk, his constant companion on collecting trips. In it he writes: "In memory of Jane Kirk, whose patience, skill, and unfailing energy were of invaluable help in attaining the results set forth in these pages." The book consists of a preamble detailing the various features of Windsor Great Park and its ancient forests, and a list of the many hundreds of Coleoptera Donisthorpe collected there, with brief habitat details for each species.

== Other writings ==
Donisthorpe, as chair of the Zoological Society of London and in his work at the Natural History Museum, London, often wrote of and described new species and species' habits from all around the world in various entomological journals, such as Annals and Magazine of Natural History.

Donisthorpe also wrote two chapters of Wild Life the World Over: Comprising Twenty-Seven Chapters Written by Nine Distinguished World-Traveled Specialists, which was published in 1953, two years after his death.

== Locations in Britain visited by Horace Donisthorpe ==
Donisthorpe visited many locations in the British Isles in which he collected and recorded unusual species of British ants and beetles:

- Aviemore, Morayshire
- Chobham Common, near Chobham, Surrey
- Box Hill, Surrey
- Nethy Bridge, Morayshire
- Parkhurst Forest, Isle of Wight
- Rannoch, Perthshire
- The New Forest, including Matley Bog, Hampshire
- Sandown, Isle of Wight
- Weybridge, principally Weybridge Heath, Surrey

== See also ==
- List of ants of Great Britain
