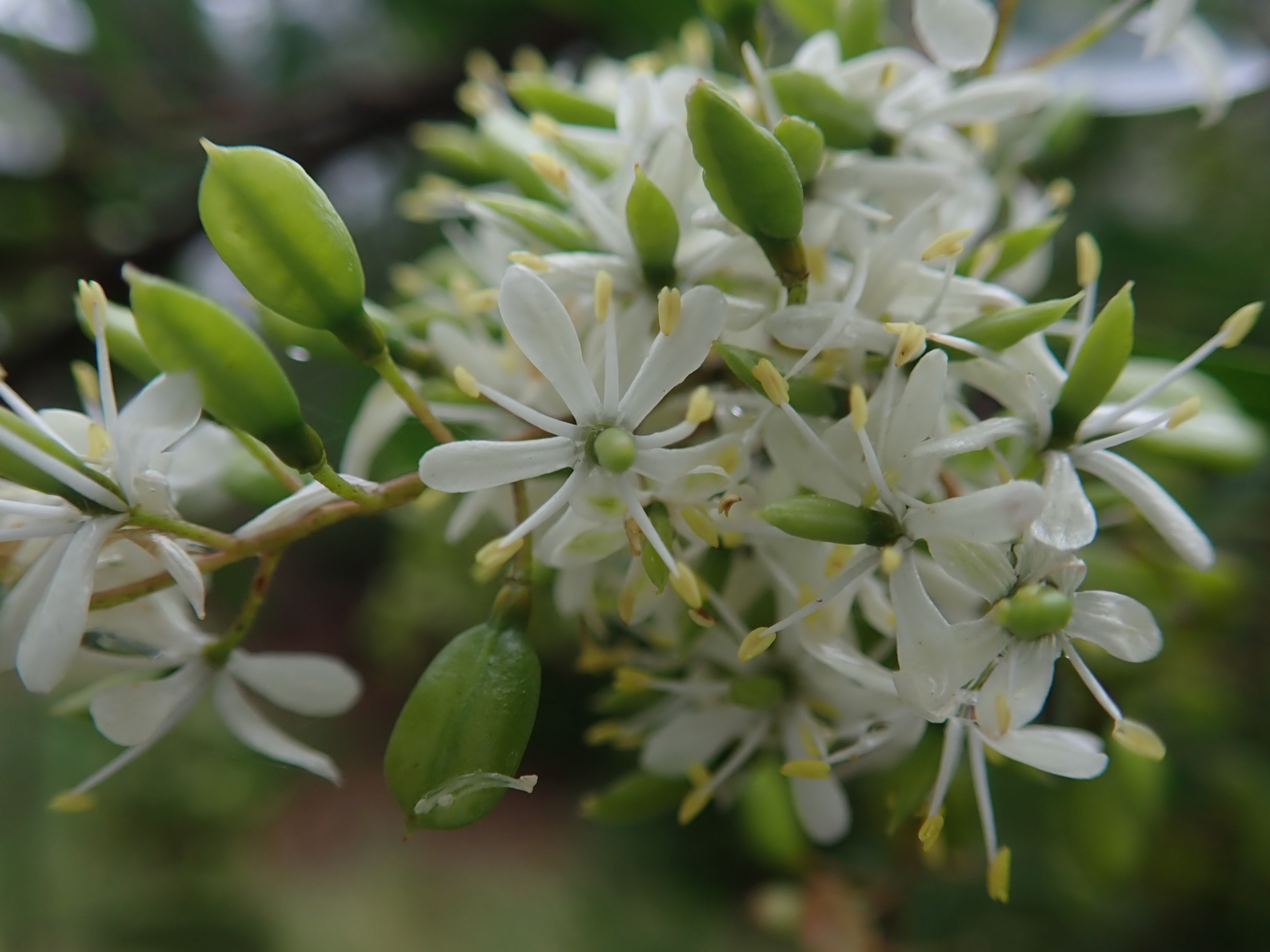
- Flowers and fruit

Scientific classification
- Kingdom: Plantae
- Clade: Tracheophytes
- Clade: Angiosperms
- Clade: Eudicots
- Clade: Asterids
- Order: Apiales
- Family: Pittosporaceae
- Genus: Bursaria
- Species: B. spinosa

Binomial name
- Bursaria spinosa Cav.

Synonyms
- Itea spinosa Andrews; Cyrilla spinosa (Andrews) Spreng.; Baeckea spinosa Sieber ex Spreng.

= Bursaria spinosa =

Species of plant

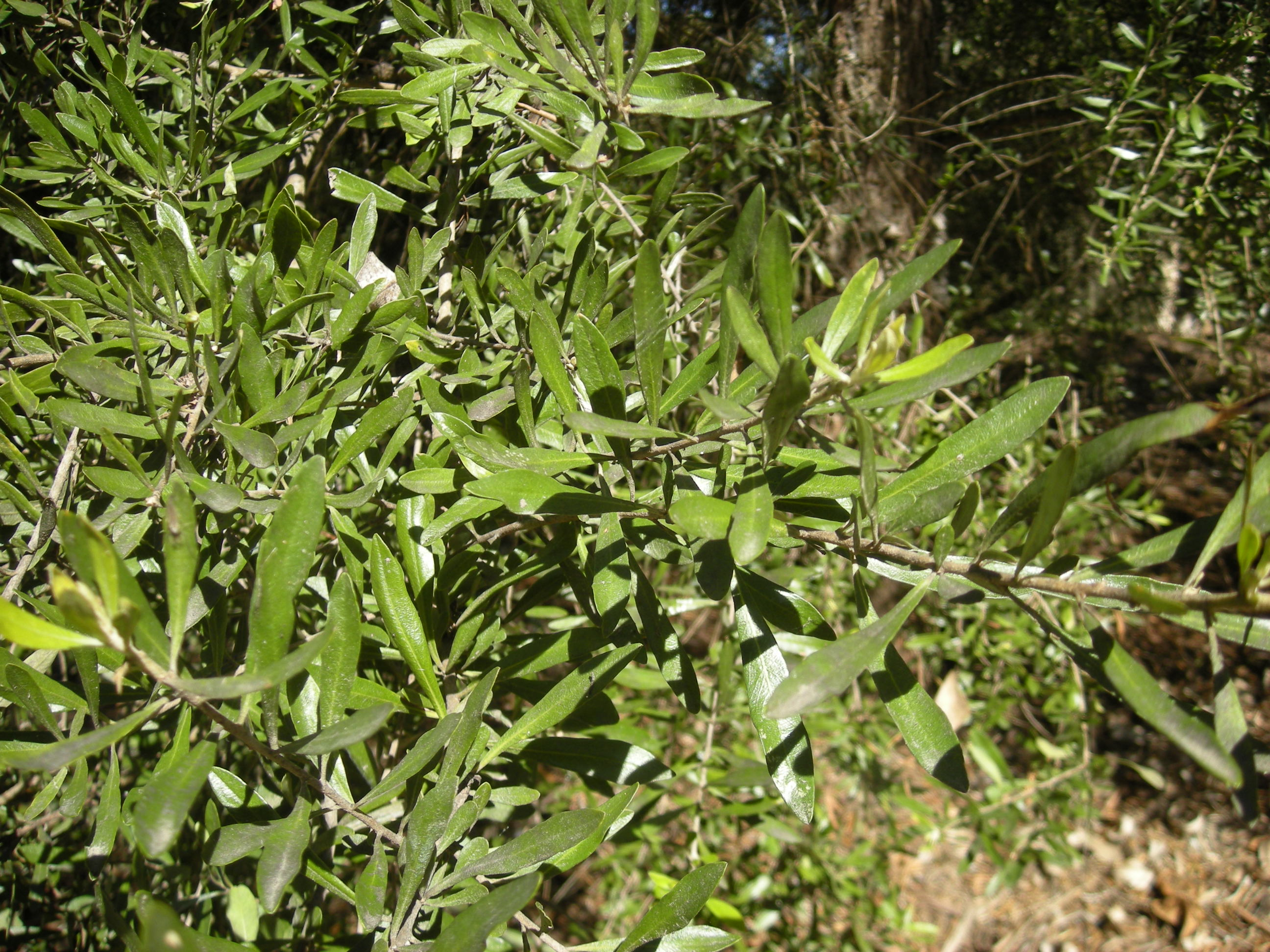
Foliage

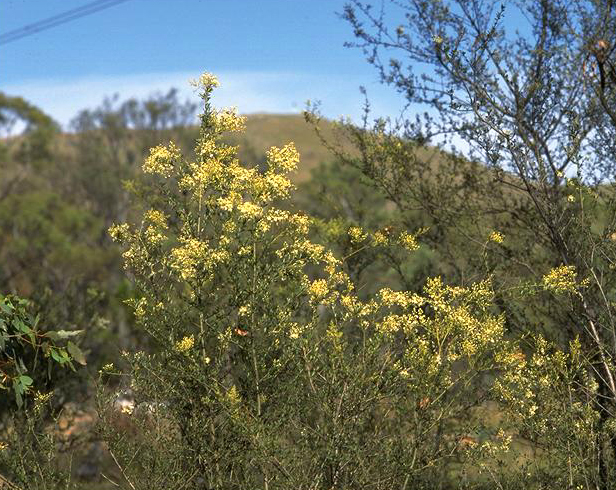
Habit, subsp. lasiophylla

Bursaria spinosa is a small tree or shrub in the family Pittosporaceae. The species occurs mainly in the eastern and southern half of Australia and not in Western Australia or the Northern Territory. Reaching 10 m (35 ft) high, it bears fragrant white flowers at any time of year but particularly in summer. A common understorey shrub of eucalyptus woodland, it colonises disturbed areas and fallow farmland. It is an important food plant for several species of butterflies and moths, particularly those of the genus Paralucia, and native bees.

== Description ==
Bursaria spinosa has a variable habit, and can grow anywhere from 1 to 12 m high. The dark grey bark is furrowed. The smooth branches are sometimes armed with thorns, and the leaves are arranged alternately along the stems or clustered around the nodes and have a pine-like fragrance when bruised. Linear to oval or wedge-shaped (ovate, obovate or cuneate), they are 2–4.3 cm long and 0.3–1.2 cm wide with a rounded apex. The fragrant flowers can occur at any time of year, but mainly appear in the summer. They are arranged in leafy pyramid-shaped panicles.

== Taxonomy and naming ==
First collected by Europeans in the vicinity of Port Jackson, Bursaria spinosa was first formally described by Antonio José Cavanilles in 1797 in his book, Icones et Descriptiones Plantarum. It is known by many common names, including Australian blackthorn, blackthorn, Christmas bush, mock orange, native blackthorn, native box, native olive, prickly box, prickly pine, spiny box, spiny bursaria, sweet bursaria, thorn box and whitethorn. Summer flowering has given rise to the name (Tasmanian) Christmas bush in Tasmania and South Australia (not to be confused with Prostanthera lasianthos). Indigenous names recorded include kurwan in Coranderrk, Victoria, and geapga from Lake Hindmarsh Station.

Bursaria spinosa is highly variable in appearance and habit, as are other species within the genus, and there have been several attempts at classification since their discovery. For example, in 1893, Jules Alexandre Daveau, in Désiré Georges Jean Marie Bois's Dictionnaire d'Horticulture, described varieties inermis (meaning 'without spines') and macrophylla ('large leaves'), but var. macrophylla was a nomen illegitimum because it had already been used by William Jackson Hooker in 1834.

A 1999 revision of the genus recognised only two subspecies and the names are accepted by the Australian Plant Census:

- Bursaria spinosa subsp. lasiophylla (E.M.Benn.) L.Cayzer, Crisp & I.Telford has shorter, wider leaves and smaller flowers than the autonym, only reaches a height of 5 m (16 ft), replaces the autonym on heavier clay soils, and occurs in New South Wales, Victoria and South Australia;
- Bursaria spinosa Cav. subsp. spinosa is a shrub or small tree to 5–10 m (16–33 ft) and is widely distributed across eastern Australia, including Queensland and Tasmania.

Subspecies lasiophylla had been known as Bursaria lasiophylla, first formally described in 1978 by Eleanor Marion Bennett, but reduced to a subspecies by Lindy Cayzer, Michael Crisp and Ian Telford in 1999.

== Distribution and habitat ==
Bursaria spinosa is widespread and common in the understorey of eucalypt woodland in all states of Australia, apart from Western Australia and the Northern Territory.

In New South Wales, B. spinosa grows in dry to wet forest in all but the most arid parts of the state, and is sometimes a weed on cleared land. In the Sydney region, it grows on clay- and shale-based soils, as an understory plant in association with grey box (Eucalyptus moluccana) and forest red gum (E. tereticornis) as well as the grass Themeda australis. It can form thickets on ungrazed farmland. In Victoria, the species is widespread and common throughout the state, except for the far northwest, in heavier soils and in alpine areas, in South Australia it is widespread in the south-east of the state, and in Tasmania it mainly occurs in dry areas.

Subspecies lasiophylla has a more restricted distribution, and in New South Wales is found on the central and south coasts and central and southern tablelands, growing in woodland on heavier clay soils than subsp. spinosa. In Victoria, this subspecies mainly grows in dry, rocky places in forest and shrubland in eastern and central-western areas of that state.

== Ecology ==
Living for 25 to 60 years, Bursaria spinosa can resprout from its woody base after bushfire. Highly rhizomatous, plants of a stand are often genetically a single plant. Despite being genetically identical, different plants and even single shoots can be very distinct in appearance (for instance, spineless shoots previously regarded as a subspecies "inermis"). Its seed is wind-dispersed and it is a colonising plant.

A wide variety of insects visit the flowers of Bursaria spinosa, the most important pollinators of which appear to be beetles of several families. Common visitors recorded from field work around Armidale were jewel beetle species, such as Curis splendens and Stigmodera inflata; longicorn beetles including Amphirhoe sloanei and Tropocalymma dimidiatum; scarab beetles; and tumbling flower beetles. Beetles and scoliid wasps all carried significant amounts of pollen. Other visitors, such as flies and butterflies, carried much lower amounts. The larvae of the jewel beetle species Astraeus crassus live in tunnels in dead and dying branches. Caterpillars which feed on Bursaria spinosa include Proselena annosana, two-ribbed arctiid (Palaeosia bicosta) and bark looper moth (Ectropis subtinctaria), while those of the clouded footman (Anestia ombrophanes) graze on algae and lichens which grow on the branches.

The bright copper (Paralucia aurifera) and ant species Anonychomyrma nitidiceps form a complex symbiotic relationship on Bursaria spinosa. Butterflies lay their eggs on the underside of the leaves, and the caterpillars feed on the leaves before pupating in the soil at the foot of the plant. The ants excavate chambers in the soil where the caterpillars sleep and later pupate, and accompany the caterpillars when the latter are feeding. They are thought to feed on the caterpillars' secretions. Caterpillars of the fiery copper (Paralucia pyrodiscus) are likewise accompanied by ants of the genus Notoncus, and the third species, the endangered Bathurst copper (Paralucia spinifera), also breeds and feeds exclusively on the subspecies lasiophylla in Central New South Wales.

Cattle and rabbits graze on young plants.

== Uses ==
The drug aesculin, used in medical research and in the 1940s, as an ingredient in sunscreen, is harvested from the plant in the Sydney region. Although its thorns make it unpopular in cultivation, it can be useful as a deterrent barrier. It can be grown from fresh seed or from cuttings and is hardy in most situations. Bursaria spinosa provides nectar for butterflies and a haven for small birds.
