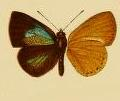

Scientific classification
- Domain: Eukaryota
- Kingdom: Animalia
- Phylum: Arthropoda
- Class: Insecta
- Order: Lepidoptera
- Family: Lycaenidae
- Subfamily: Theclinae
- Tribe: Luciini
- Genus: Titea
- Species: T. sublutea

Binomial name
- Titea sublutea (Bethune-Baker, 1906)

Synonyms
- Candalides sublutea Bethune-Baker, 1906; Philiris sublutea Bethune-Baker, 1906

= Titea sublutea =

Species of butterfly

Titea sublutea is a species of butterfly of the family Lycaenidae. It is found in New Guinea.

== Subspecies ==
- Titea sublutea sublutea (West Irian to Papua New Guinea)
- Titea sublutea extensa Tite, 1963 (West Irian: Arfak Mountains, Angi Lakes)
