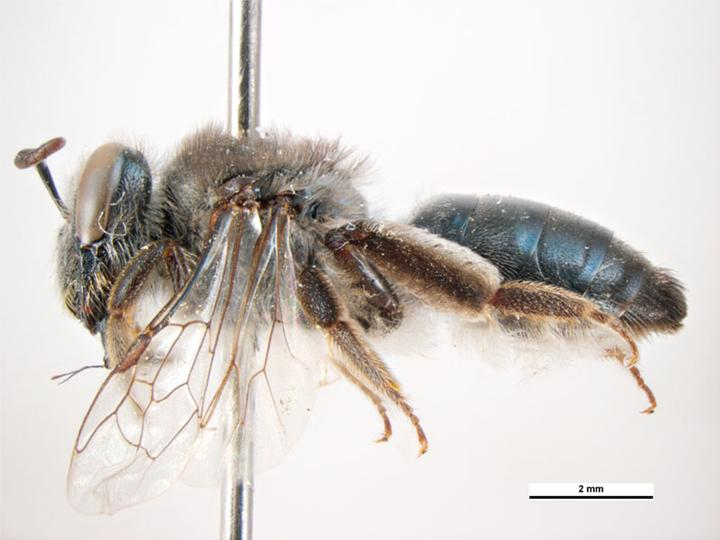
- Female

Scientific classification
- Kingdom: Animalia
- Phylum: Arthropoda
- Clade: Pancrustacea
- Class: Insecta
- Order: Hymenoptera
- Family: Colletidae
- Genus: Leioproctus
- Species: L. alleynae

Binomial name
- Leioproctus alleynae (Rayment, 1935)

Synonyms
- Paracolletes alleynae Rayment, 1935

= Leioproctus alleynae =

Species of bee

Leioproctus alleynae, or Leioproctus (Leioproctus) alleynae, is a species of bee in the family Colletidae and subfamily Colletinae. It is endemic to Australia. It was described by Australian entomologist Tarlton Rayment in 1935.

== Description ==
Male body length is about 8 mm. Integumental colouration is mainly black; the abdomen is "an iridescent greenish-purple of great beauty"; the hair is golden to reddish-gold.

== Distribution and habitat ==
The species occurs in south-eastern Australia. The type locality is Croydon, Victoria.

== Behaviour ==
The adults are flying mellivores. Flowering plants visited by the bees include Bursaria spinosa and Leptospermum scoparium as well as Eucalyptus species.

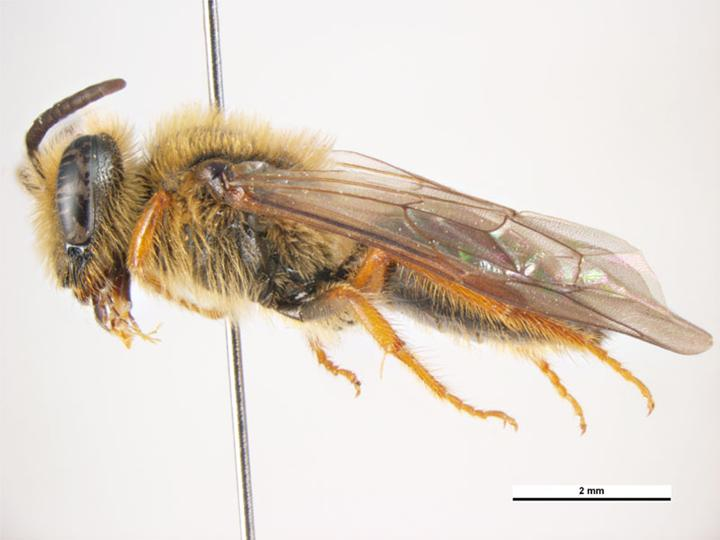
Male
