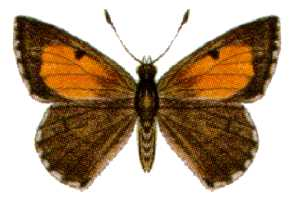
- Lucia limbaria

Scientific classification
- Kingdom: Animalia
- Phylum: Arthropoda
- Clade: Pancrustacea
- Class: Insecta
- Order: Lepidoptera
- Family: Lycaenidae
- Tribe: Luciini
- Genus: Lucia; Swainson, 1833
- Species: L. limbaria

Binomial name
- Lucia limbaria (Swainson, 1833)

= Lucia (butterfly) =

Monotypic butterfly genus in family Lycaenidae

Lucia is a monotypic butterfly genus in the family Lycaenidae. The single species is Lucia limbaria, the small copper butterfly of Australia, commonly known as the chequered copper butterfly or as the grassland copper butterfly.

Lucia limbaria is an endemic but rarely seen butterfly, found in sporadic locations in south-eastern South Australia, south-western Victoria and as far north as central Queensland.

Lucia limbaria is very dependent on particular ant species in the Iridomyrmex genus, with which it has a symbiotic relationship, and also particular native oxalis (sorrel) hostplants.

== Lucia limbaria ==
Lucia limbaria, the only species within the genus Lucia, is an Australian butterfly commonly known as the small copper butterfly, which differentiates it from similar but slightly larger butterflies of the genus Paralucia. Other common names include the chequered copper butterfly and the grassland copper butterfly.

=== Description ===
This butterfly is not easily identified in the field as it is small, with wingspan 2–3 cm (0.79–1.18 in), fly mainly during the morning in sunshine very close to the ground with a brisk, almost skipper-like, flight. Wingspan of males is typically 23 mm (0.91 in) and females 25 mm (0.98 in). It is more noticeable on bright warm days when males settle with orange forewings faced toward the sun, while females are larger and often darker on the upper side with less orange. Contrasting black and white wing-fringes clearly outline the wing fringes for both sexes.

Males are mostly settled with wings closed for long periods after midday and most active mid-morning when they form leks close to or within breeding areas, typically establishing territories by perching on bare ground or, sometimes, on stones, leaf litter, grass and herbs. Females are less active, and often perch on herbs or the food plant.

The eggs are white or light grey and mandarin-shaped with diameter about 0.8 mm (0.031 in) and numerous green dimples, usually laid singly or in small groups and covered with scales, deposited under a leaf of a foodplant or sometimes on upper surface of a lower leaf. Unusually for an Australian butterfly, numerous long fine ‘hairs’ from the female’s abdomen are attached to the eggs.

The larva grows to a length of about 2 cm (0.79 in), is off-white and hairy, with a number of pale and dark brown longitudinal stripes, and a black plate on the thorax and on the last abdominal segment. The larvae undergo an unusual transformation to bright green pre-pupa. The pupa grows to 10–12 mm (0.39–0.47 in) in length, and is initially green changing to a light greenish-brown as it matures.

=== Life history ===
Lucia limbaria is found in sporadic locations in south eastern South Australia, south western Victoria and as far north as central Queensland. An isolated population has been reported from a remote site in Western Australia. Within South Australia it was once not uncommon on the Adelaide Plains, has been recorded in the Lower and Upper South-east, Mt. Lofty Ranges, and historically in Yorke Peninsula, but is still regarded as rare. The areas of distribution are characterised by a temperate climate of warm to hot dry summers and cool to cold wet winters with rainfall between 700 mm (28 in) in the north to 350 mm (14 in) in the south, and mean summer temperature between 23 and 32 °C (73 and 90 °F).

The main documented native foodplants of Lucia limbaria are low spreading forbs, Oxalis perennans (native sorrel) in South Australia and Oxalis exilis (least yellow sorrel) in the Australian Capital Territory. These native oxalis plant species are hardy and occur widely in Australia.

Oxalis perennas can become more abundant after clearing and can do well in areas with low or moderate levels of grazing but is also choked by thick pastures that consist mainly of introduced species so rarely seen in areas lacking protection of the plant from overcrowding. It dies off above ground when moisture levels become too low, but thick roots remain and reshoot when moisture levels are sufficient.

Lucia limbaria will eat all parts of the foodplant but prefer leaves and flowers. The larvae (caterpillars) initially eat just the surface of a leaf, but later instars eat the whole leaf. Observations suggest that Lucia limbaria may accept Oxalis corniculata, an introduced weed, as a food plant.

Lucia limbaria larvae are attended in early life stages by common black ants of the Iridomyrmex genus, particularly gracilis and rufoniger groups. The association between larvae and ant is essential in the wild for larvae survival, and classified as obligately myrmecophilous. The female butterfly only lays eggs on the food plant in the presence of attendant ants, which construct a chamber to support the larvae if one is not already present at the base of the chosen plant. The larvae and butterflies produce pheromones matching those of the particular ant colony, which protects them from predation by the ants. Pupation occurs within the ant chambers. The ants actively attend and protect the larvae and pupae in specially constructed chambers at depths of 50 to 75 mm (2 to 3 in), bringing larvae out during cooler periods of the day or at night to feed and then returning them to the same chamber. The ants receive in return a nutritious honeydew produced by the caterpillar.

The foodplant is perennial and, during periods of no hostplant growth, the larvae are believed to neither eat leaves of the plant nor be fed by ants - instead they appear to aestivate in the underground ant chambers, surviving for up to seven weeks while awaiting any rains that promote new growth of the hostplants.

Butterflies normally emerge from their pupae during mornings within their flight period, typically between September and May.

Favourable environmental conditions for Lucia limbaria include some openness of grass structures (which support activity by ants), and the foodplant appears to more prominently support butterflies in rocky or degraded areas, steep hillsides, or zones with lower rainfall. The simultaneous reliance of the butterfly on specific climate conditions, particular foodplants, and a symbiotic relationship with particular ant species contribute to its scarcity.

== Impact of proposed Adelaide MotoGP circuit on Lucia limbaria (2026) ==
On 19 February 2026 Peter Malinauskas as Premier of South Australia, announced that an annual motorcycling carnival, the MotoGP, would take place in Adelaide's Eastern Park Lands from late 2027. The Premier stated publicly that "about 45" trees would be destroyed, and that the century-old Glover East Playspace would need to be "moved" to make way for the motorcycle race track, but analysis indicates this significantly under-states the likely impact.

A letter has been sent to the president of Federation Internationale Motocyclisme (FIM), MotoGP's governing body, claiming the project breaches FIM's own code of environmental practice and FIM's sustainability policy. It has been reported that the MotoGP circuit could require as many as 400 trees to be cut down, and that enough signed petitions have been gathered to trigger a formal parliamentary inquiry into the circuit.

The South Australian government released the design for the MotoGP street circuit on 30 August 2026. The announcement stated that circuit redesign would see 43 significant trees felled, along with a further 335 of that the government has classified as "regulated, unregulated, invasive, deal, or poor health", another 88 trees would be relocated, and another 22 "under investigation". The Premier said trees would be replaced on a 10 to 1 basis, meaning 3770 trees would be planted. South Australia's Department for Infrastructure and Transport indicates that it is expected 377 trees will be removed, of which 42 are significant, 88 trees would be relocated in accordance with arborist advice, and 22 require further detailed below-ground investigation to confirm they can be retained. Prior to release of the plans, there had been protests about tree loss, with more than 43,000 people signing a petition calling for a halt to works.

Public consultation on the track would start on 31 August and run until 20 September 2026 but the Premier stated that the government was "genuinely interested in the feedback it would receive".

Additionally, there is a $15 million "Adelaide Park Lands Nature Positive Package" which the government has designed with the Conservation Council of SA, for projects including increasing tree canopy in the parklands, butterfly habitat restoration, and "revitalisation" of the River Torrens, and water infrastructure to support reintroduction of the platypus.

Conservation Council SA CEO, Kirsty Bevan, had a mixed reaction to the announcement, praising the $15 million investment, but lamenting the track going ahead in the city's parklands. The Conservation Council had sought to have the track moved instead to a ready-made park in Tailem Bend, and not proceed within the parklands, but every indication from the SA government has been that would not change.

Before release of the design, the SA government had also not briefed the City of Adelaide, but they were "made aware of aspects of the plan". Lord Mayor of Adelaide, Jane Lomax-Smith, said the government has agreed to brief the City of Adelaide within the next 24 hours. She said she thought the organisers had done "the best to minimise the impact", but stressed "the devil is always in the detail". Her view is that the MotoGP is not the most appropriate thing to happen in the Adelaide Park Lands, that there is a need to better understand the impacts, and that provision of a racetrack in the centre of a city, in what is essentially parklands, is quite challenging. The Lord Mayor also noted that "clearly there would be a substantial change to the nature of our parklands" including "a lot more tarmac".

Liberal MP Jack Batty questioned how effective the three-week public consultation would be, since construction is scheduled to commence in December 2026, asking "How on earth can we have a genuine consultation when you're already firing up the bulldozers?"

Documents were lodged with the Federal Court's Queensland Registry on 18 September 2026 seeking an urgent injunction relating to work on the MotoGP Circuit. The Queensland applicant, Joshua Hogan, has told the court he is concerned about rider safety on the proposed track.

Lucia limbaria was not observed on the Adelaide plains for 60 years before it was rediscovered in 2011 in Adelaide's Victoria Park after which the City of Adelaide set aside and carefully managed a biodiversity site in Pakapakanthi (Park 16). Most colonies on the Adelaide plains are small and continue to be locally vulnerable.

The proposed circuit map presented to media for the MotoGP abuts against the remnant grassland in Pakapakanthi and its vulnerable colony of the chequered copper butterfly.

The southern part of Pakapakanthi, affected by the proposed MotoGP circuit area, has become "a showcase for biodiversity management and a refuge for community engagement in an urban environment". The proposed circuit area is close enough to their habitat that it is considered the chequered copper butterfly colony will not survive construction of grandstands or the presence of people during MotoGP events.

Pakapakanthi, being home to a range of important habitat plants including the host foodplant Oxalis perennans, is also visited by other butterfly species and other insects, and therefore a range of birdlife and other wildlife, which are also vulnerable to disruption by crowds and noise, such as that associated with a MotoGP event. Park 16 is the largest, and most closely monitored for conservation purposes, of the three colonies of the chequered copper butterfly in the Adelaide Parklands, and vulnerable to destruction without a sufficiently wide buffer to prevent destruction of its habitat by the MotoGP.

Lucia limbaria

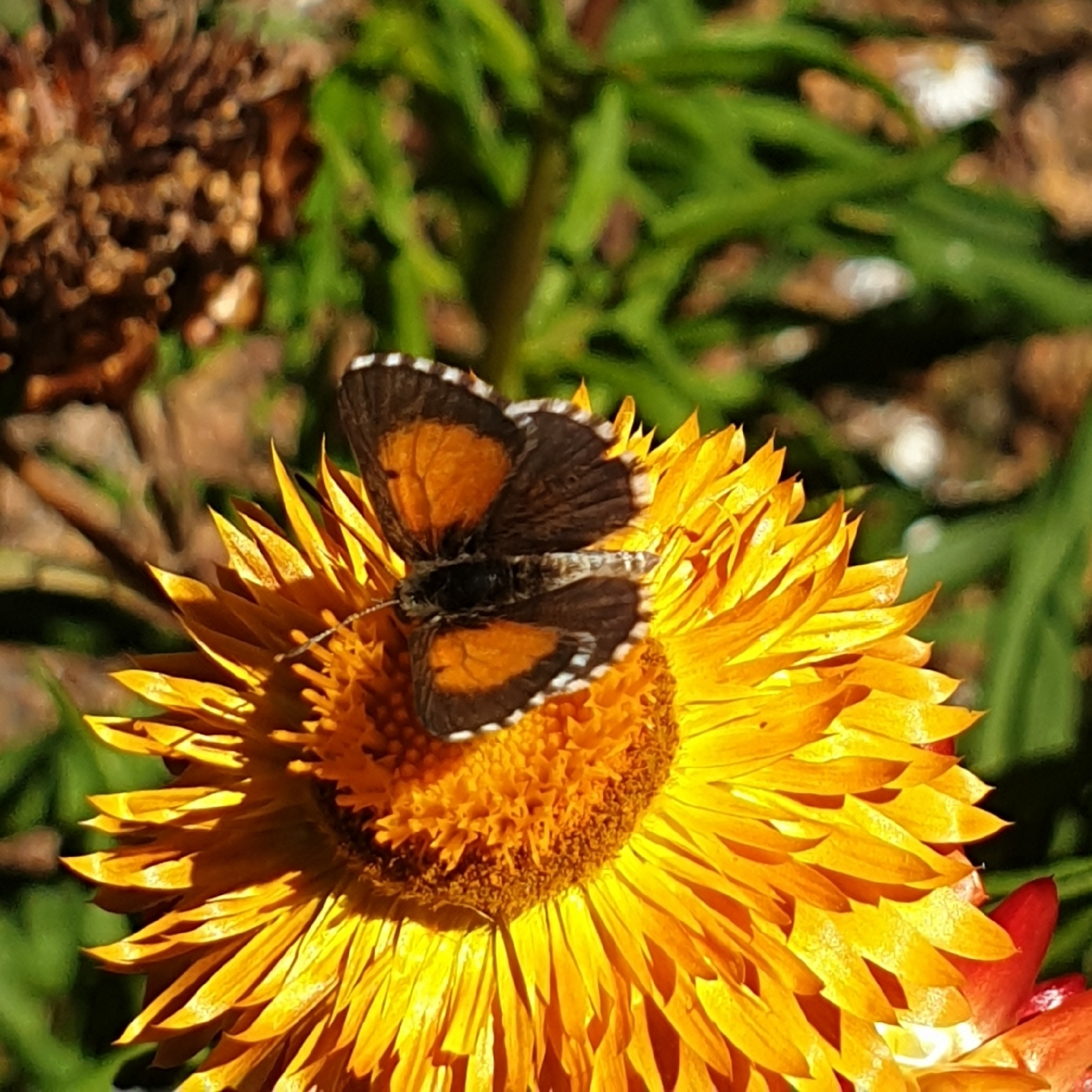

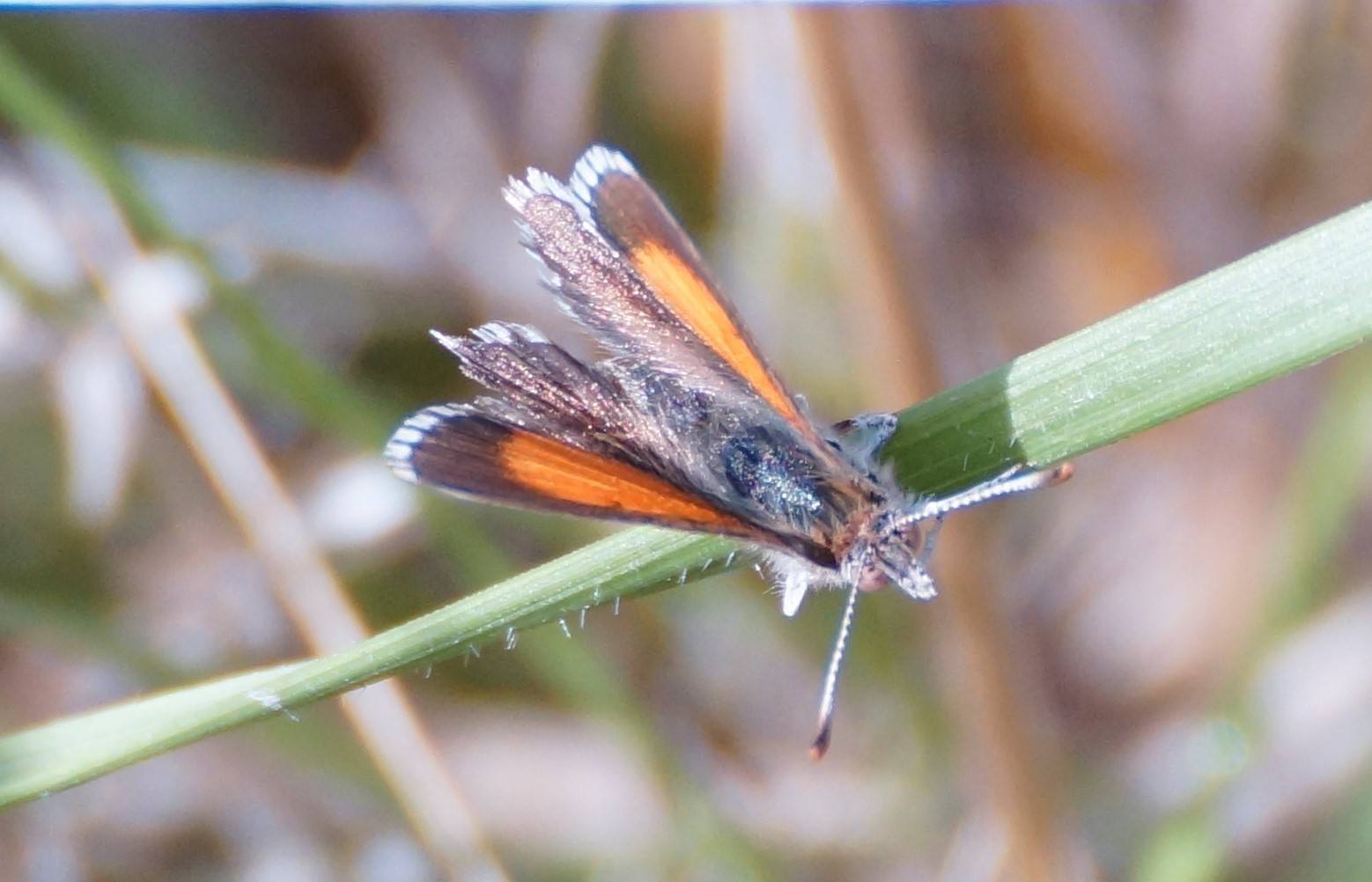

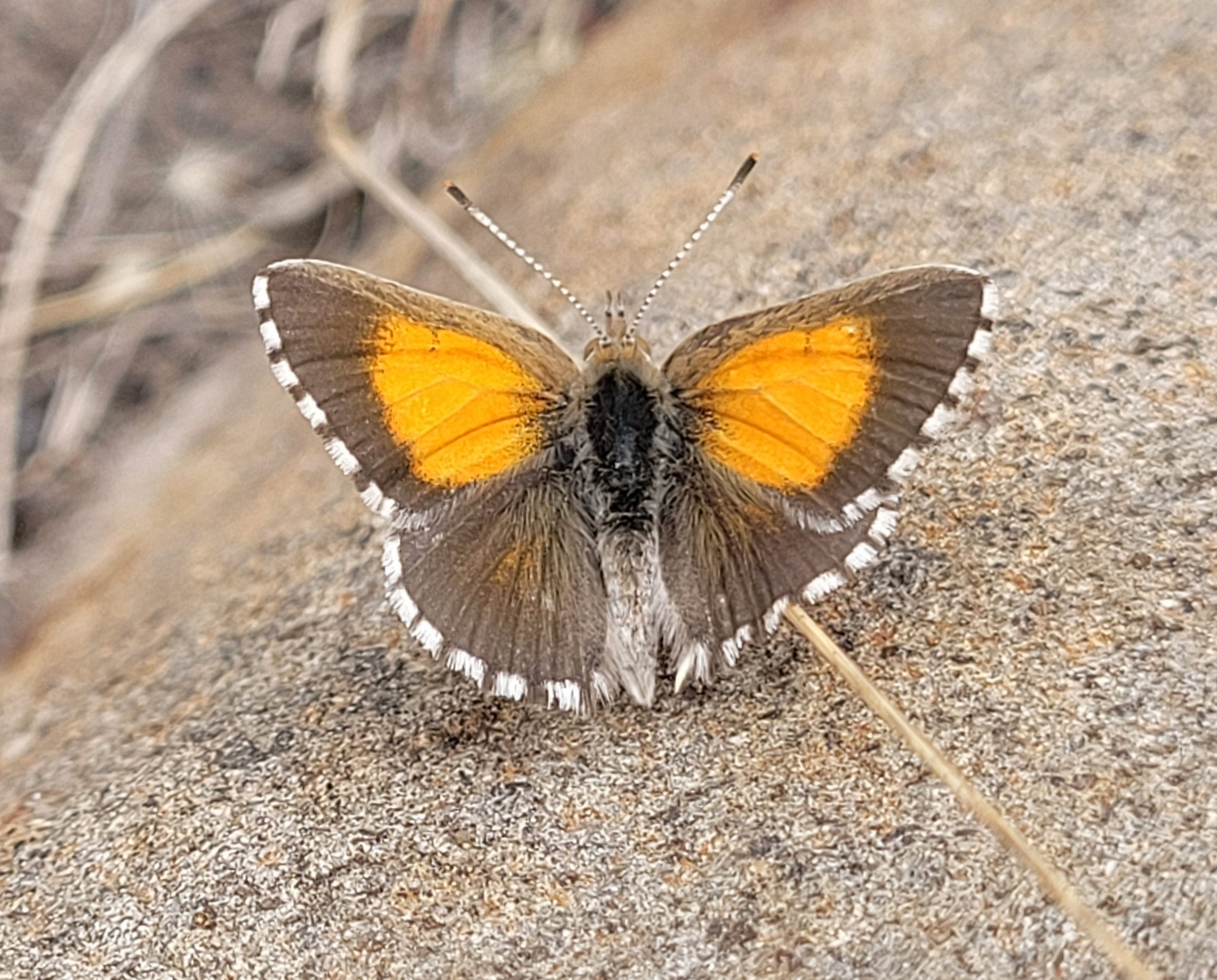

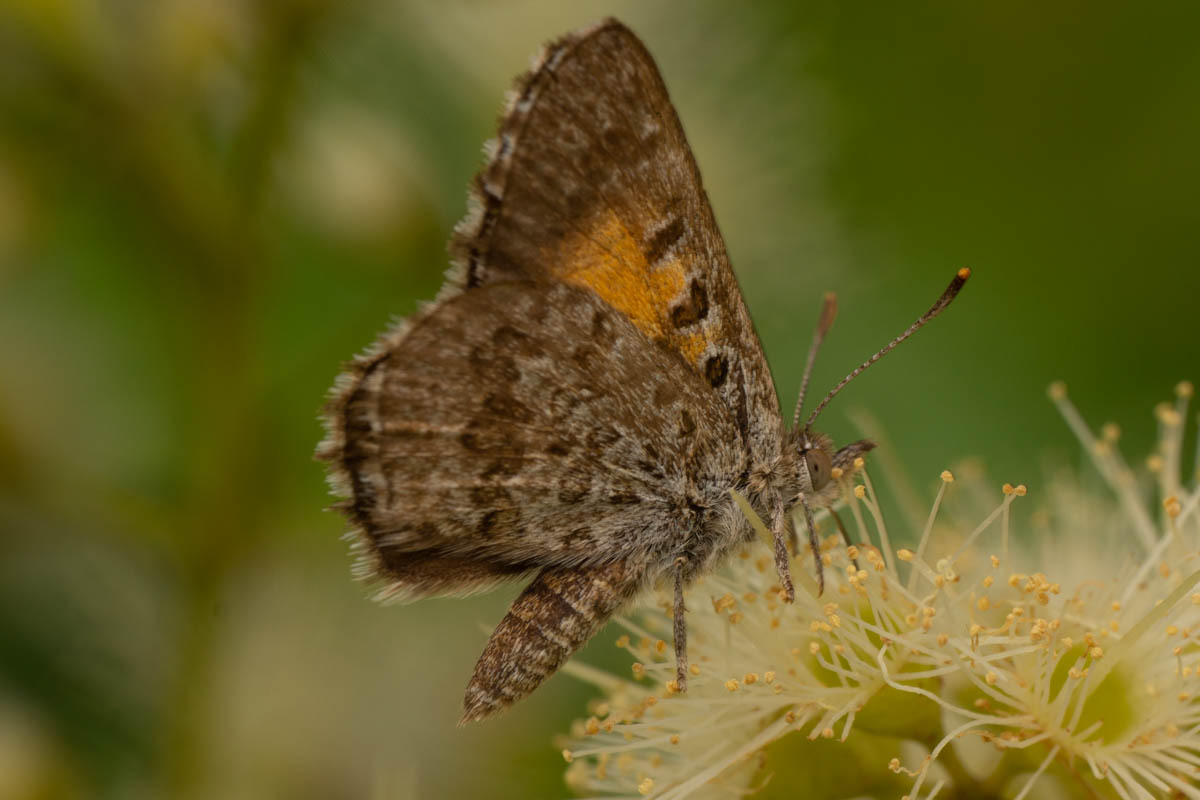
