= Ingamells =

Ingamells is a surname. Notable people with the surname include:

- Bob Ingamells (1914–1986), Australian politician
- John Ingamells (1934–2013), British art historian and writer
- Philip ('Phil') Ingamells, Australian conservationist and photographer
- Rex Ingamells (1913–1955), Australian poet
- Thomas Ingamells (born 1982), British DJ and record producer
