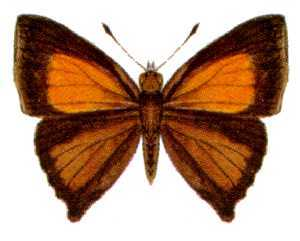

Scientific classification
- Kingdom: Animalia
- Phylum: Arthropoda
- Clade: Pancrustacea
- Class: Insecta
- Order: Lepidoptera
- Family: Lycaenidae
- Genus: Paralucia
- Species: P. pyrodiscus

Binomial name
- Paralucia pyrodiscus (Rosenstock, 1885)

Synonyms
- Lucia pyrodiscus Doubleday, 1847; Lucia pyrodiscus Rosenstock, 1885; Chrysophanus aenea Miskin, 1890; Paralucia lucida Crosby, 1951

= Paralucia pyrodiscus =

Species of butterfly

The fiery copper or dull copper (Paralucia pyrodiscus) is an endemic Australian butterfly of the family Lycaenidae. One of the two subspecies, P. p. lucida, is commonly known as the Eltham copper.

The larvae feed on Bursaria spinosa and are associated with Notoncus ants.

== Distribution ==
It is found in eastern Australia from central Queensland through eastern New South Wales and into eastern Victoria. Outlying populations occur in north Queensland and central Victoria.

== Behavior ==
The larvae of P. p. lucida are nocturnal and feed solely on Busaria spinosa after dusk for many hours. When the temperature is above 15 °C, the larvae become inactive. They live for long periods of time, and remain active, though less-so, in the winter months. During these times, they rest in the subterranean nest chambers of different Notoncus ants, depending on their geographic distribution. During the day, larvae also rest in the ants' nest chambers near the roots of B. spinosa. At night, ants herd the larvae up the Bursaria plants. Their movement signals to other larvae, creating large numbers of movement each night. Several ants commonly accompany individual larva and remain with them until they finish eating. If a larva is disturbed while feeding, it retreats back into the nest and usually does not return that night. Larvae do not leave their host plant and ant nest during their development, and they pupate inside the ant nest.

== Taxonomy ==
The fiery copper was first described by Rudolph Rosenstock in 1885.

=== Subspecies ===
The species is divided into the following two subspecies:

- Paralucia pyrodiscus pyrodiscus (found from southern Queensland to eastern Victoria)
- Paralucia pyrodiscus lucida Crosby, 1951 (the Eltham copper, found in central Victoria, especially Eltham)

== Conservation ==
The subspecies Eltham copper was thought extinct in the 1950s. A major conservation movement surrounding it started in 1987 after a colony in the Melbourne area was found, and its existence publicised that year with the release by the Department of Conservation, Forests and Lands of a book on the butterfly by David Cameron and Phil Ingamells. It is listed as "threatened" on the Victorian Flora and Fauna Guarantee Act 1988. Populations have declined due to loss of habitat by urbanisation and loss of a natural fire regime. Two reserves in Eltham were partially burnt in 1998 in an attempt to improve habitat quality for the Eltham copper. The butterfly was found in remnant bushland near Montmorency Railway Station in March 2021, the area was at risk as part of clearing for Hurstbridge line duplication works. The state government then cancelled the proposed duplication works that would impact the butterfly habitat.

Paralucia pyrodiscus

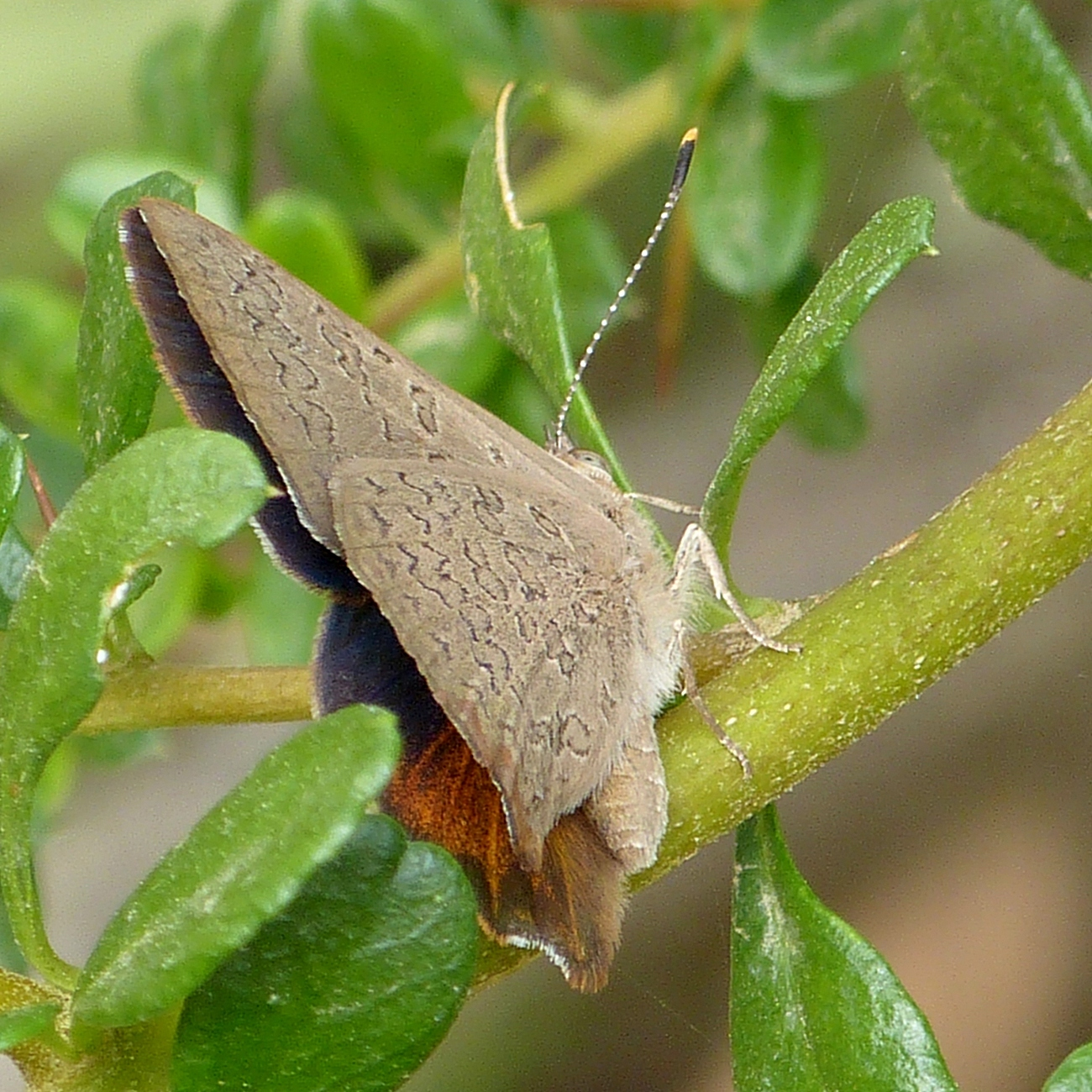

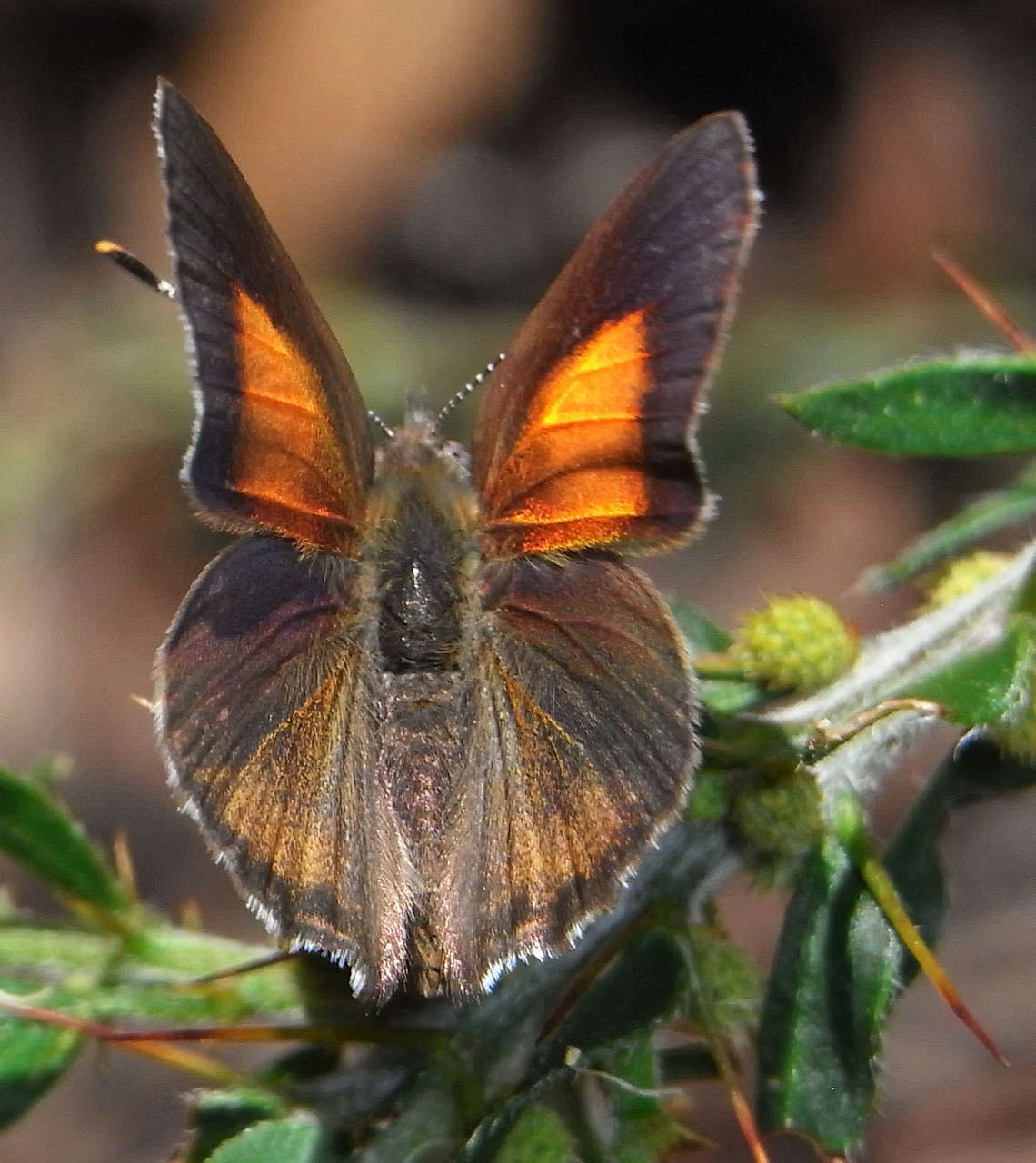

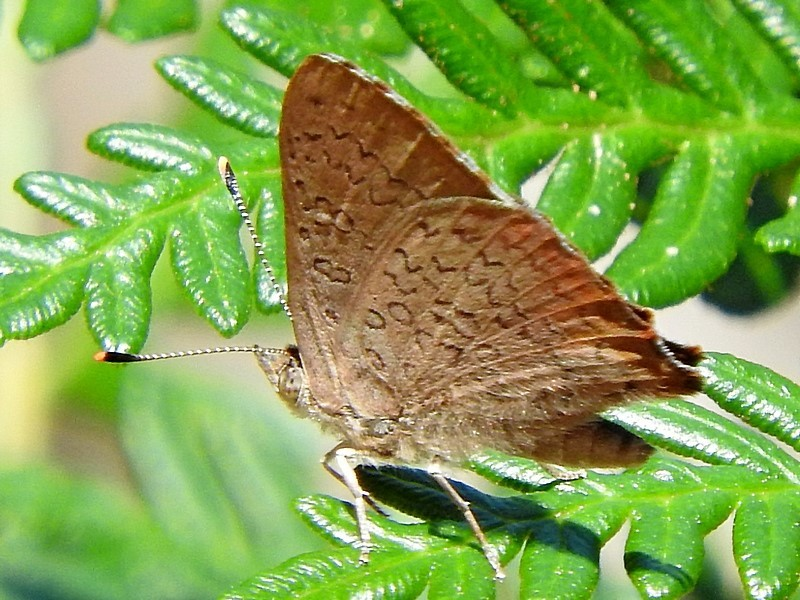

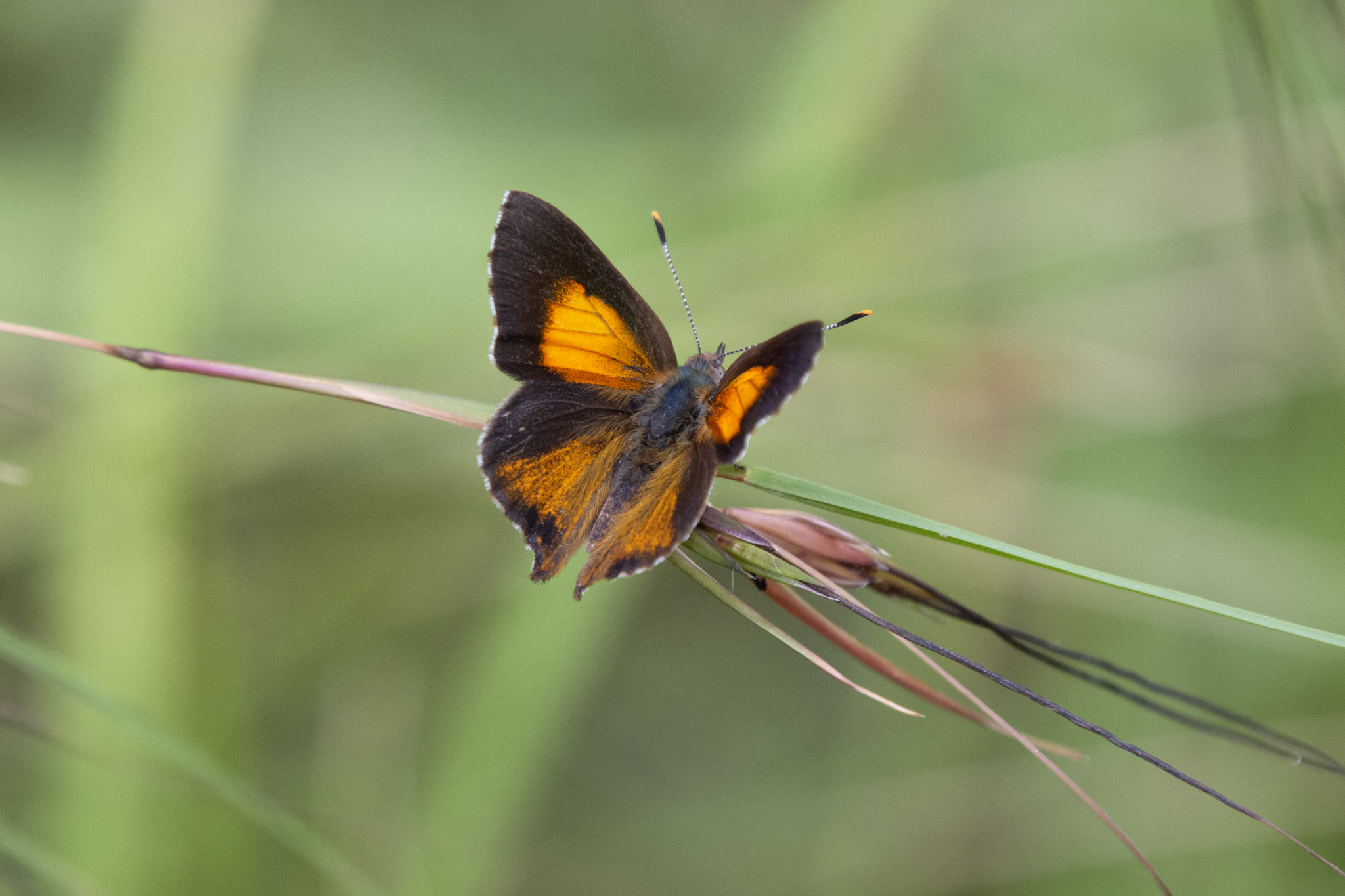

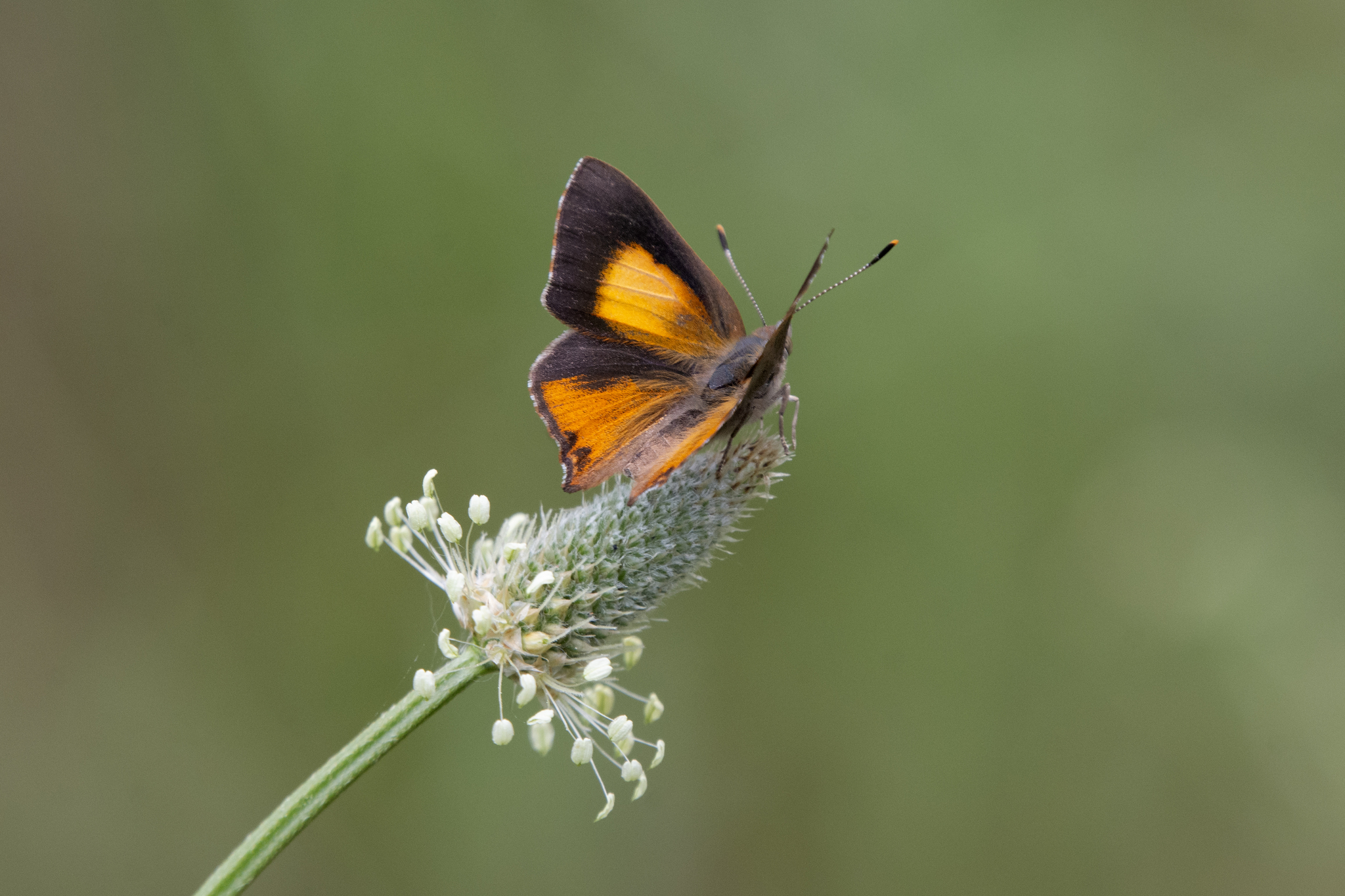
