= Paralucia spinifera =

Bathurst copper

Conservation status
- Endangered (IUCN 2.3)

Scientific classification
- Kingdom: Animalia
- Phylum: Arthropoda
- Clade: Pancrustacea
- Class: Insecta
- Order: Lepidoptera
- Family: Lycaenidae
- Genus: Paralucia
- Species: P. spinifera

Binomial name
- Paralucia spinifera W.H. Edwards & Common, 1978

Species of butterfly

Paralucia spinifera, commonly known as the Bathurst copper or purple copper, is a species of butterfly in the family Lycaenidae. It is endemic to Australia.

== Description ==
The body is relatively thick. The wingspan is of 20–30 mm. The upper sides of its wings are copper-colored and have a purple, blue, and green iridescence when in the sunlight. The undersides of the wings are patterned with brown, black, and gray. Its black antennae are dotted with white spots, and end with a black tip.

== Habitat ==
The habitat of the purple copper butterfly is found primarily in altitudes above 900 m (3000 ft), and are generally seen with exposure to the full day sun (often with a west to north appearance), and with extremes of cold such as regular winter snowfalls or heavy frosts where it feeds on a form of blackthorn.

== Life cycle ==
The butterflies emerge between August (later at higher altitude sites) and November, with a two-week peak of activity in September. After mating, the female oviposits eggs on or near the area of Bursaria spinosa subsp. lasiophylla. After hatching, the larva is attended by the ant A. itinerans which is thought to offer the larva predator protection and receive nutritional secretions from the larva.

== Conservation ==
The Bathurst copper butterfly is considered endangered in NSW and is listed on Schedule 1 of the Threatened Species Conservation Act 1995 (TSC Act). The Bathurst copper butterfly is also listed nationally as a vulnerable species under section 178 of the Environment Protection and Biodiversity Conservation Act 1999 (EPBC Act).

Current threats to the Bathurst copper butterfly include clearing and development, weed invasion, grazing, and changes in controlled burn procedures.

== Sources ==
- Threatened Species Unit Conservation Programs and Planning Division, Central Directorate NSW NPWS (June 2001). "Bathurst Copper Butterfly" (PDF). Hurstville, New South Wales: NSW National Parks and Wildlife Service. Archived from the original (PDF) on 14 January 2012.
