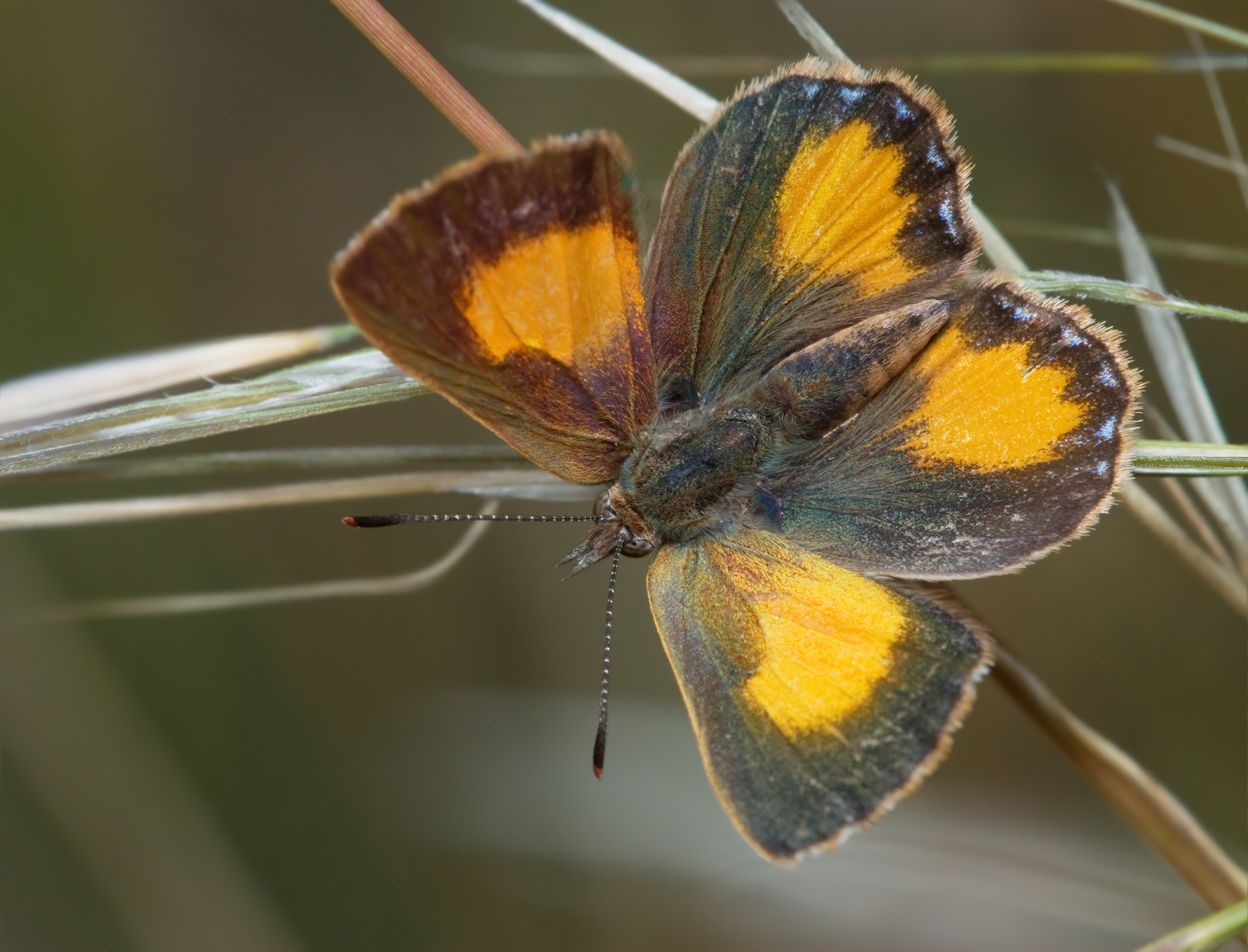

Scientific classification
- Kingdom: Animalia
- Phylum: Arthropoda
- Clade: Pancrustacea
- Class: Insecta
- Order: Lepidoptera
- Family: Lycaenidae
- Genus: Paralucia
- Species: P. aurifer

Binomial name
- Paralucia aurifer Blanchard, 1848

= Paralucia aurifera =

Bright copper

Species of butterfly

The bright copper (Paralucia aurifer) is a butterfly belonging to the family Lycaenidae.

== Taxonomy ==
The bright copper was first described by Émile Blanchard in 1848.

== Description ==
The adult bright copper has a wingspan of 25 millimetres (0.98 in).

The flight season is from December to January.

The wings are dull brown on top with gold-orange triangles in the middle of each wing.

== Distribution and habitat ==
It is found in eastern Australia including New South Wales, eastern Queensland, Victoria, Tasmania and the Australian Capital Territory.

== Ecology ==
The bright copper and the ant species Anonychomyrma nitidiceps form a complex symbiotic relationship on Bursaria spinosa. Butterflies lay their eggs on the underside of the leaves, and the caterpillars feed on the leaves before pupating in the soil at the foot of the plant. The ants excavate chambers in the soil where the caterpillars sleep and later pupate, and accompany the caterpillars when the latter are feeding. They are thought to feed on the caterpillars' secretions.

== Gallery ==
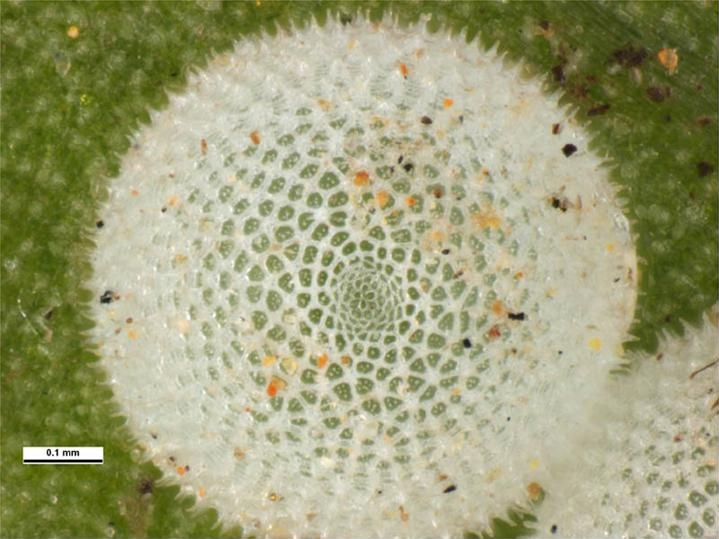
Egg, dorsal view

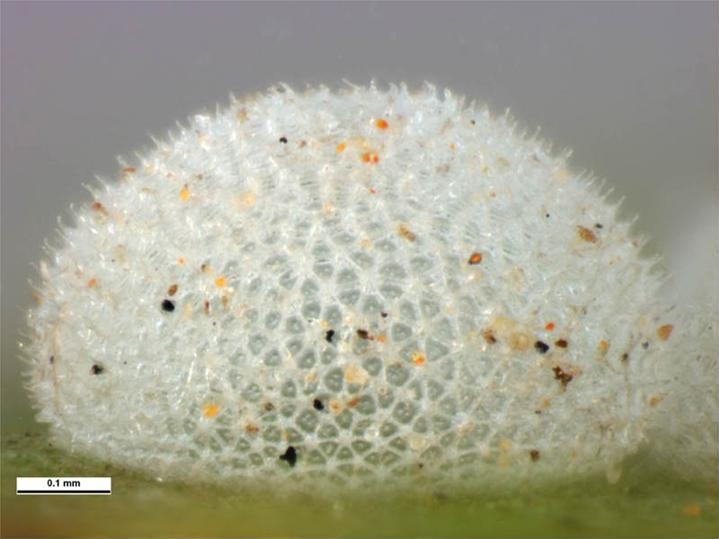
Egg, lateral view

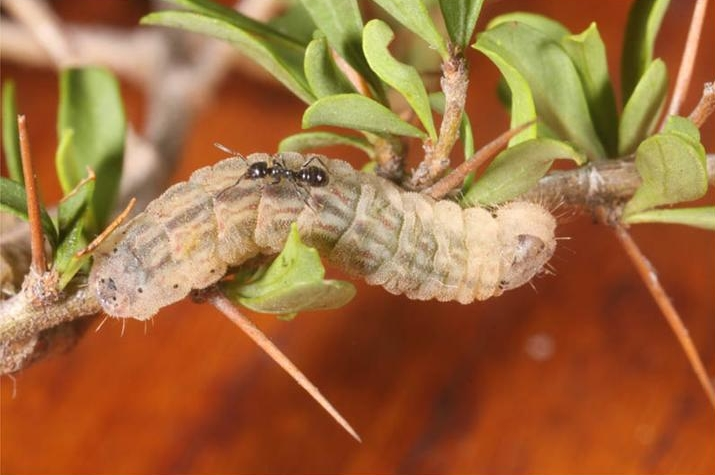
Larva

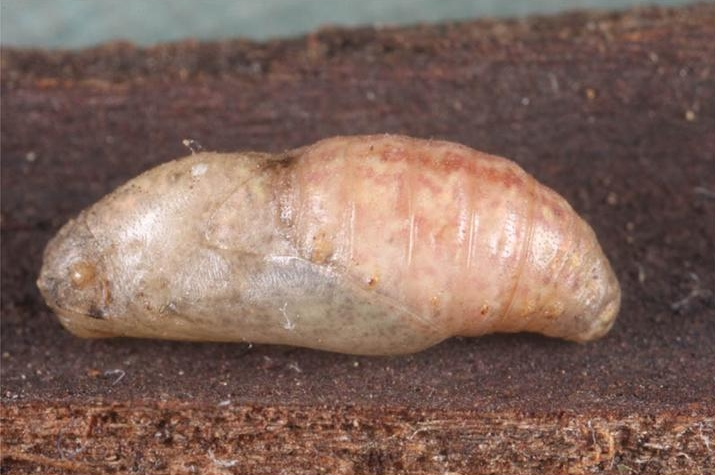
Pupa

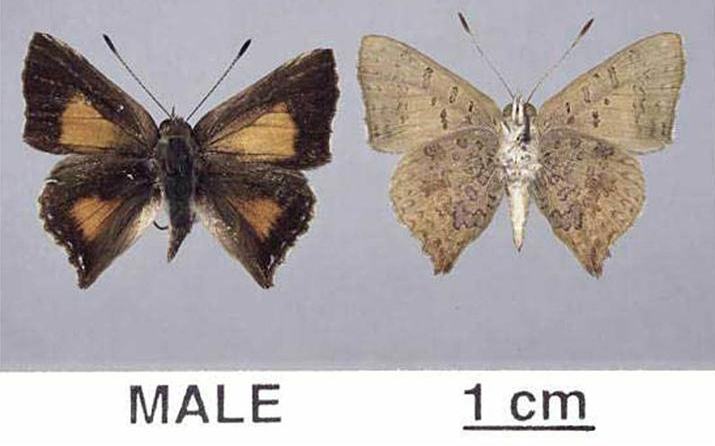
Mounted male

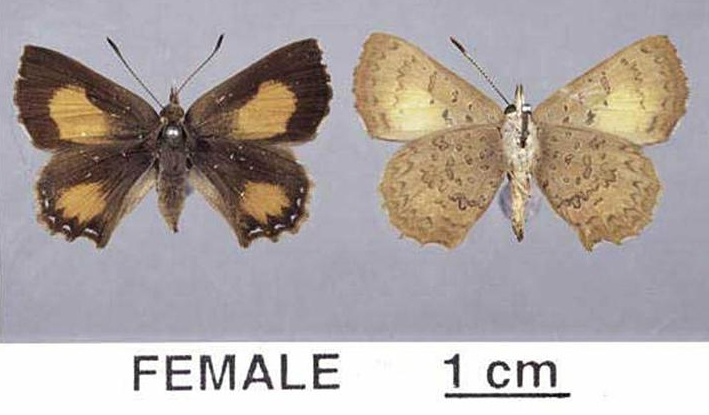
Mounted female

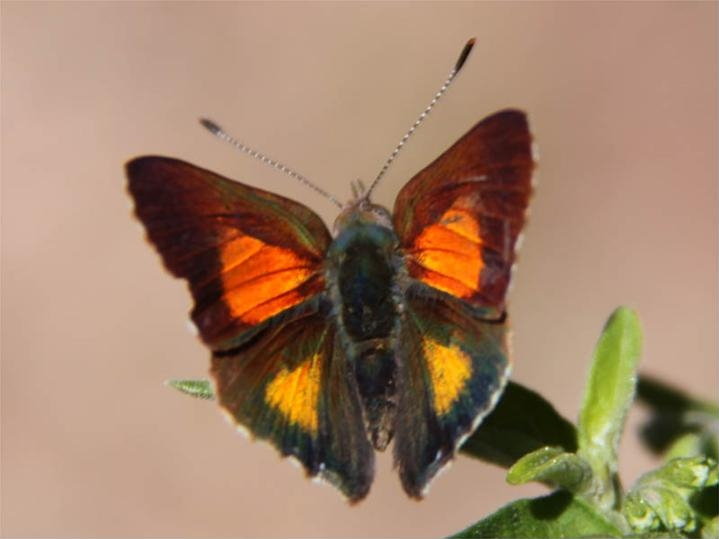
Male

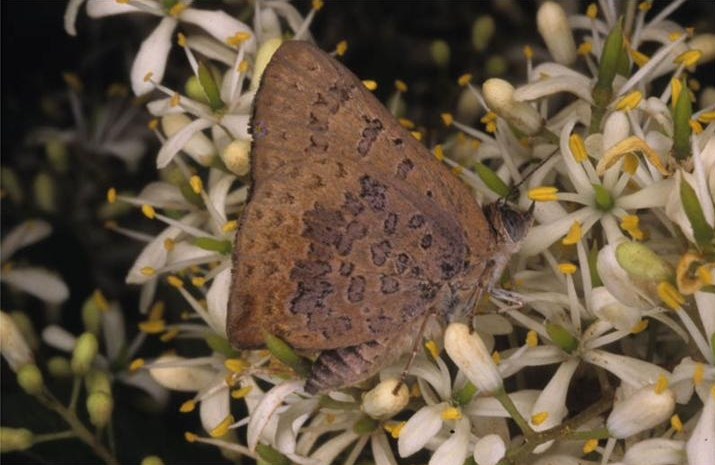
Female

== See also ==
- List of butterflies of Tasmania
