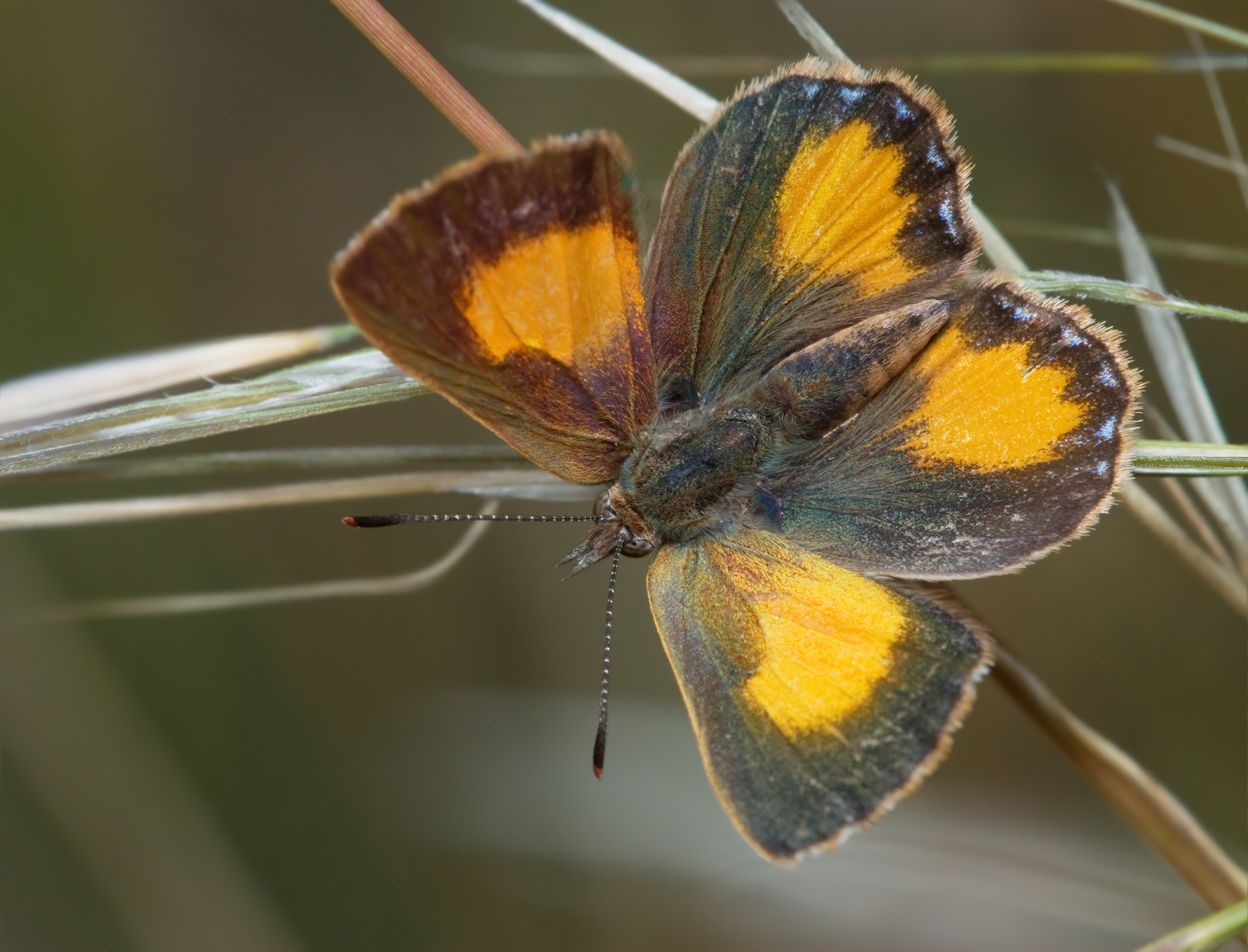
- Paralucia aurifera

Scientific classification
- Kingdom: Animalia
- Phylum: Arthropoda
- Clade: Pancrustacea
- Class: Insecta
- Order: Lepidoptera
- Family: Lycaenidae
- Subfamily: Theclinae
- Tribe: Luciini

Genera
- Presently 8, see text

= Luciini =

Tribe of butterflies

The Luciini are a tribe of butterflies in the family Lycaenidae. It includes 22 species in 4 genera and is restricted to Australia and New Guinea.

== Genera ==
As of 2025, the tribe Luciini has, following studies in 2023 and reclassifications of the previously-included genera Hypochrysops, Titea and Philiris, been relegated to four genera:

- Acrodipsas
- Lucia
- Paralucia
- Pseudodipsas
