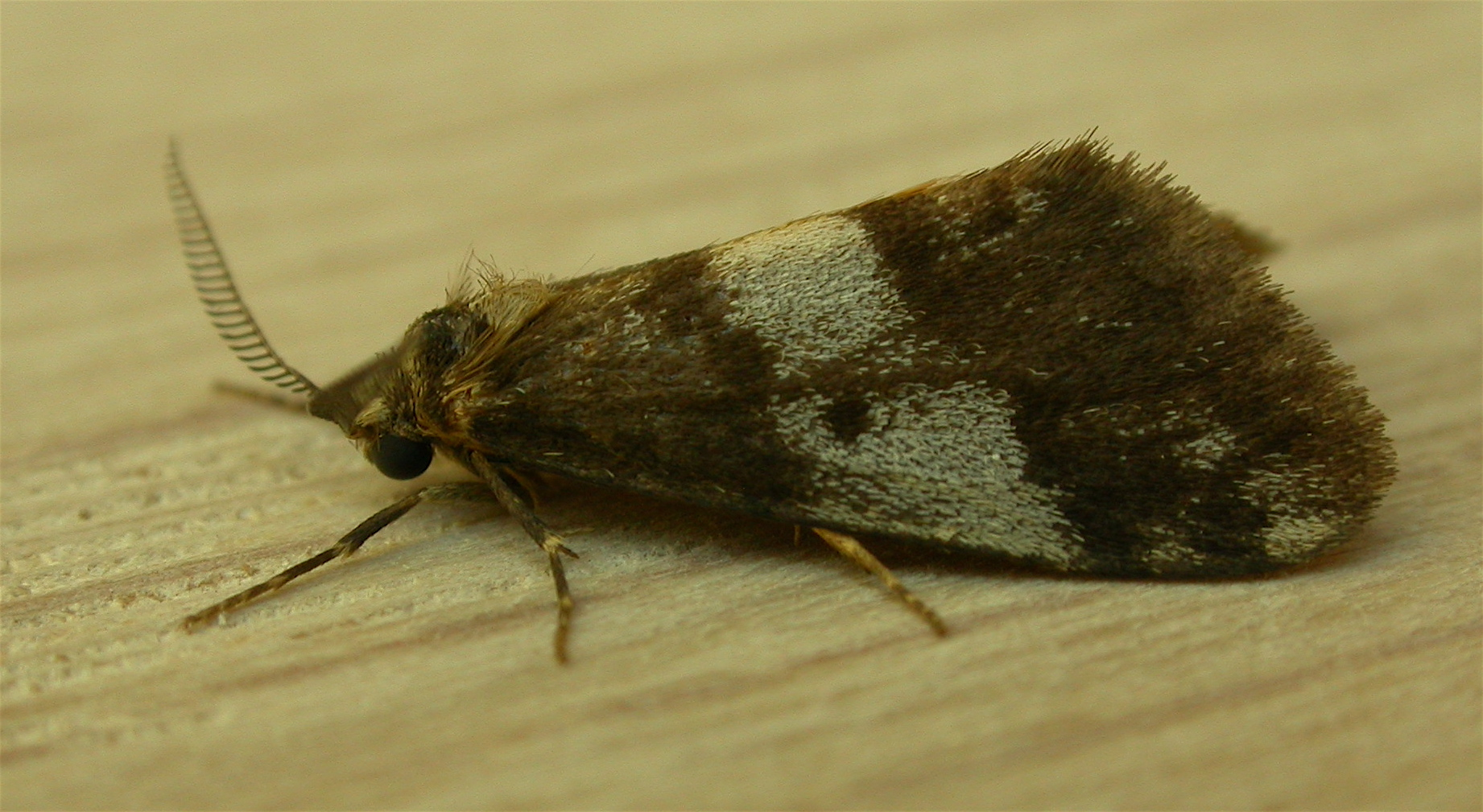
- Anestia semiochrea

Scientific classification
- Kingdom: Animalia
- Phylum: Arthropoda
- Class: Insecta
- Order: Lepidoptera
- Superfamily: Noctuoidea
- Family: Erebidae
- Subfamily: Arctiinae
- Tribe: Lithosiini
- Genus: Anestia; Meyrick, 1886

Synonyms
- Xanthodule Butler, 1886

= Anestia =

Genus of moths

Anestia is a genus of moth in the subfamily Arctiinae.

== Species ==
- Anestia ombrophanes Meyrick, 1886
- Anestia semiochrea Butler, 1886
