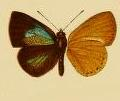
- Titea sublutea from Descriptions of new Species of Butterflies of the Division Rhopalocera from Africa and from New Guinea, 1908

Scientific classification
- Domain: Eukaryota
- Kingdom: Animalia
- Phylum: Arthropoda
- Class: Insecta
- Order: Lepidoptera
- Family: Lycaenidae
- Subfamily: Theclinae
- Tribe: Luciini
- Genus: Titea; Eliot, 1973

= Titea =

Butterfly genus in family Lycaenidae

Titea is a genus of butterflies in the family Lycaenidae.

Species include:

- Titea caerula Tite, 1963
- Titea sublutea Tite, 1963
