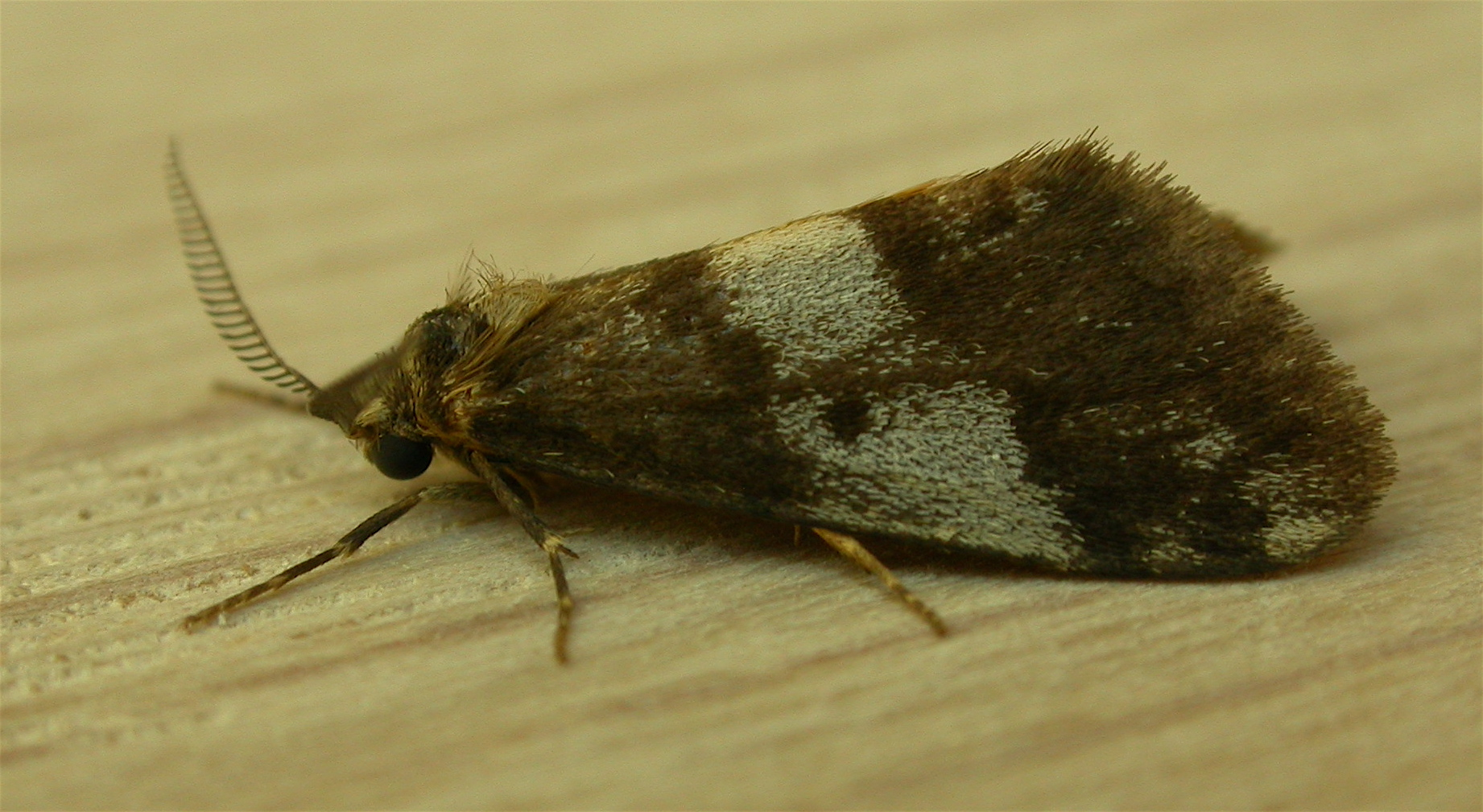

Scientific classification
- Domain: Eukaryota
- Kingdom: Animalia
- Phylum: Arthropoda
- Class: Insecta
- Order: Lepidoptera
- Superfamily: Noctuoidea
- Family: Erebidae
- Subfamily: Arctiinae
- Genus: Anestia
- Species: A. semiochrea

Binomial name
- Anestia semiochrea (Butler, 1886)

Synonyms
- Xanthodule semiochrea Butler, 1886; Xanthodule inquinata Butler, 1886; Anestia inquinata T. P. Lucas, 1890

= Anestia semiochrea =

Marbled footman

Species of moth

Anestia semiochrea, the marbled footman, is a moth of the subfamily Arctiinae first described by Arthur Gardiner Butler in 1886. It is found in Australian Capital Territory, Queensland and New South Wales.

The female has only vestigial wings (it is brachypterous).

The larvae feed on lichen.
