= Pseudodipsas =

Scientific classification
- Domain: Eukaryota
- Kingdom: Animalia
- Phylum: Arthropoda
- Class: Insecta
- Order: Lepidoptera
- Family: Lycaenidae
- Tribe: Luciini
- Genus: Pseudodipsas; C. & R. Felder, 1860

Butterfly genus in family Lycaenidae

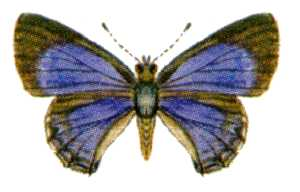

Pseudodipsas is a genus of butterflies in the family Lycaenidae with six species, two of which are unnamed. They are found in areas of Australia and New Guinea.

== Species ==
- Pseudodipsas eone (C. & R. Felder, 1860)
- Pseudodipsas cephenes Hewitson, 1874 - Cephenes blue
- Pseudodipsas aurea Sands, 1976
- Pseudodipsas una (D’Abrera, 1971)
