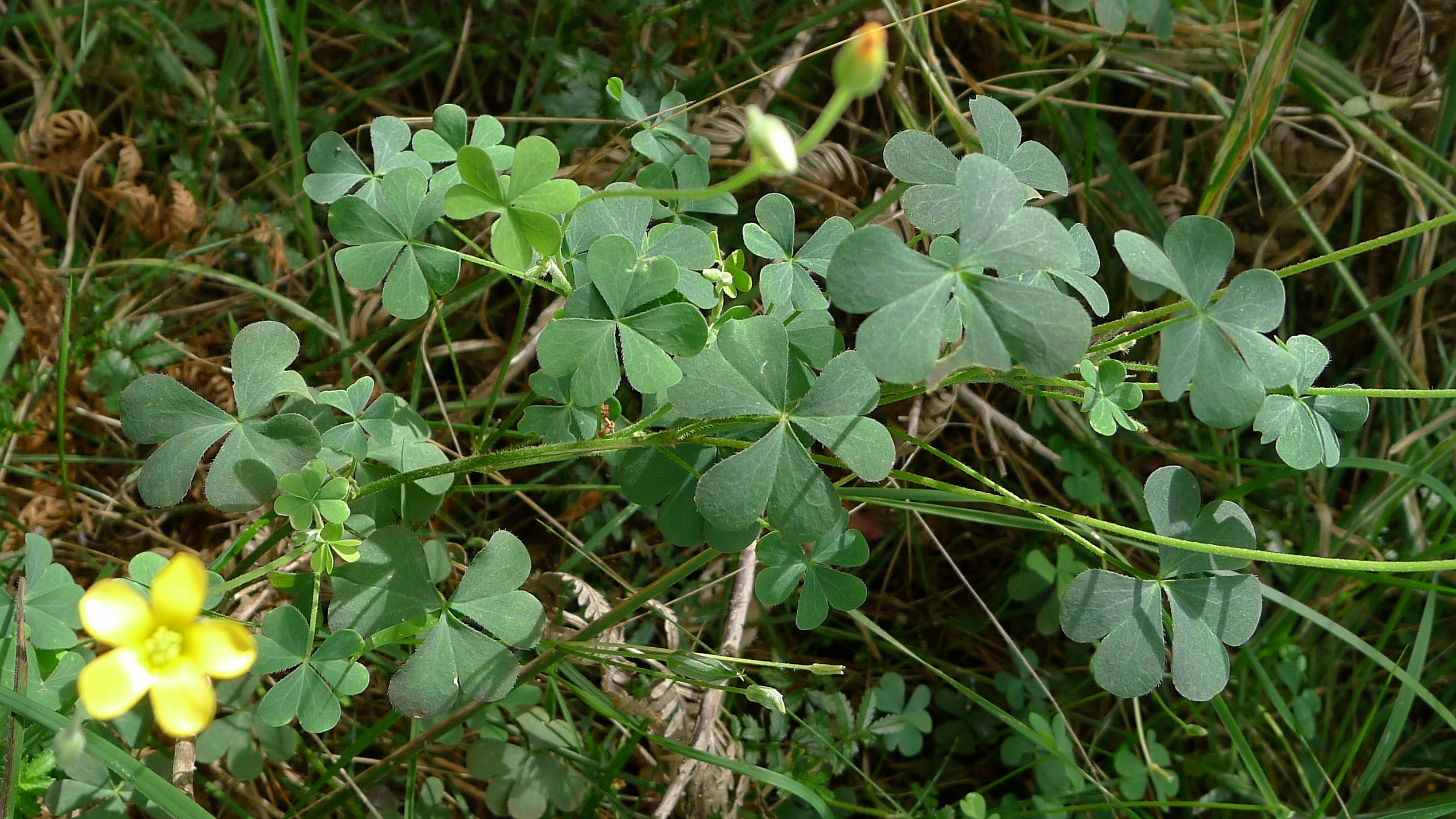
- Growing at Rostella Reserve, Dilston, Tasmania

Scientific classification
- Kingdom: Plantae
- Clade: Embryophytes
- Clade: Tracheophytes
- Clade: Angiosperms
- Clade: Eudicots
- Clade: Rosids
- Order: Oxalidales
- Family: Oxalidaceae
- Genus: Oxalis
- Species: O. perennans

Binomial name
- Oxalis perennans Haw.

= Oxalis perennans =

Species of flowering plant in the family Oxalidaceae

Oxalis perennans, known as native oxalis, native sorrel or grassland wood-sorrel, is a species of flowering plant in the wood sorrel family Oxalidaceae. A small yellow-flowered perennial herb with a stout taproot and three-parted leaves, it is native plant to Australia, where it grows in every state and in the Northern Territory. It is also recorded in New Zealand, where it is regarded as introduced.

== Description ==
Oxalis perennans is a perennial herb about 0.05–0.3 m high, anchored by a thick woody taproot. The yellow flowers are held clear of the leaves by slender stems. The stems grow to about 25–30 cm long. Each leaf has three leaflets that are notched at the tip. These leaflets are sometimes tinged purplish. Fruits are narrow, and more or less cylindrical. Fruit capsules are 8–30 mm long.

It is a host plant of the rarely seen Small Copper butterfly (Lucia limbaria).

== Taxonomy ==
The species was named by the English botanist Adrian Hardy Haworth, who published it in 1803 in Miscellanea Naturalia. Three heterotypic synonyms are recognised: Oxalis cognata and Oxalis preissiana, both named by Ernst Gottlieb von Steudel in 1844, and Oxalis corniculata var. preissiana, Reinhard Knuth's 1930 recombination of the latter.
