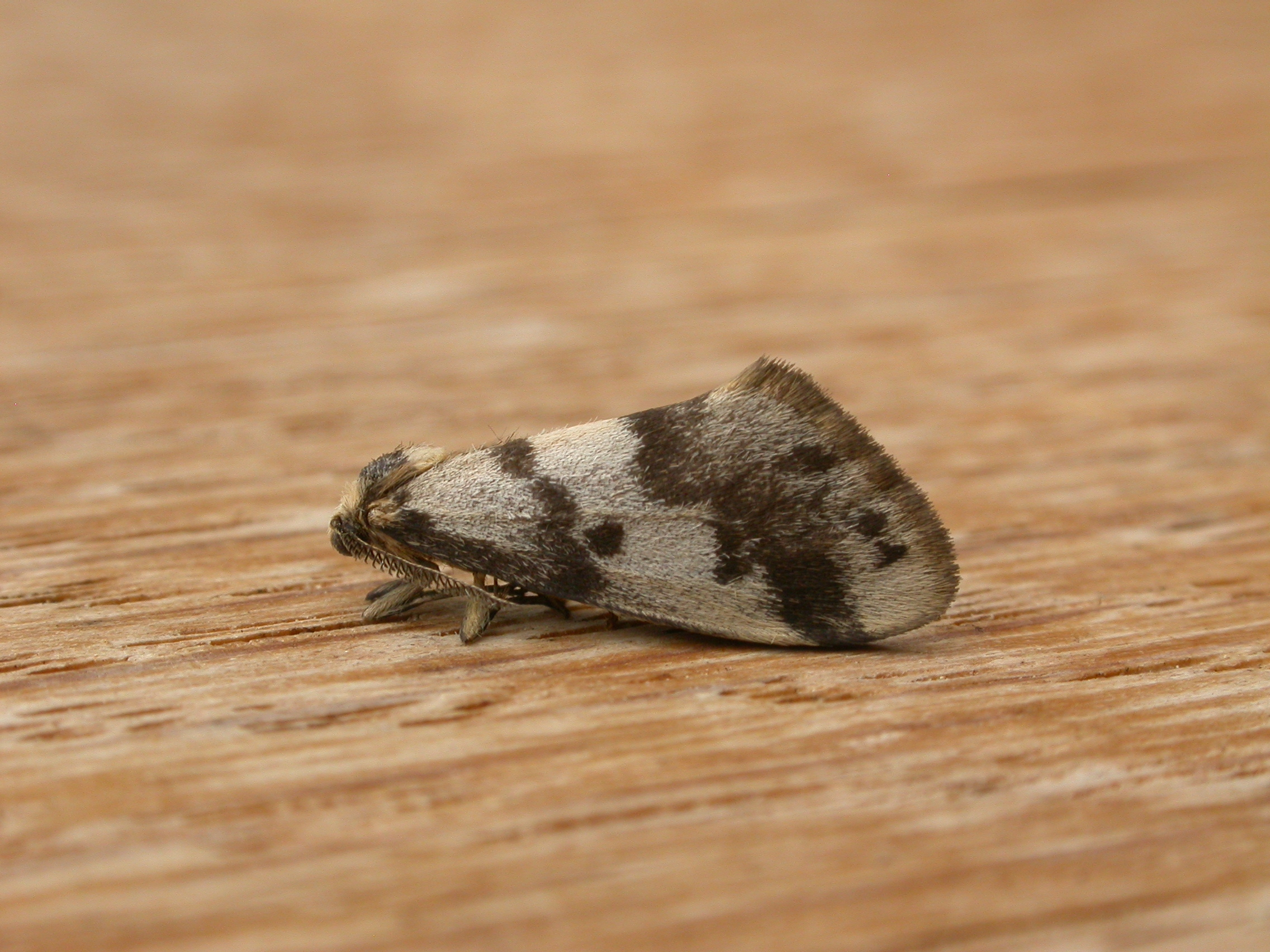

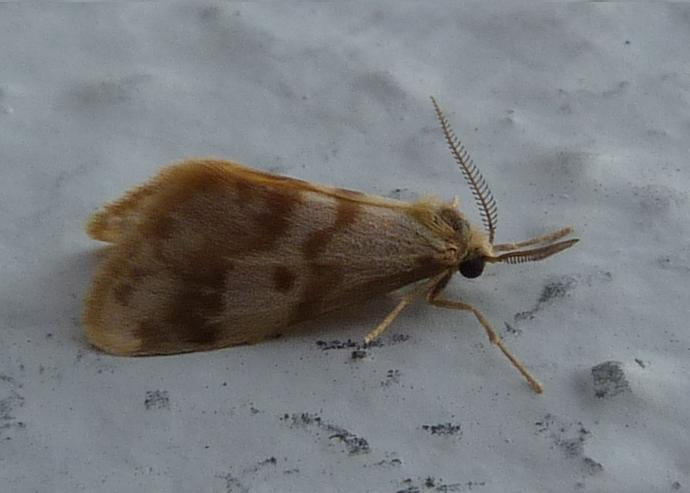

Scientific classification
- Kingdom: Animalia
- Phylum: Arthropoda
- Clade: Pancrustacea
- Class: Insecta
- Order: Lepidoptera
- Superfamily: Noctuoidea
- Family: Erebidae
- Subfamily: Arctiinae
- Genus: Anestia
- Species: A. ombrophanes

Binomial name
- Anestia ombrophanes Meyrick, 1886

Synonyms
- Xanthodule ombrophanes; Thallarcha fuscogrisea Rothschild, 1913

= Anestia ombrophanes =

Clouded footman

Species of moth

Anestia ombrophanes, the clouded footman, is a moth of the subfamily Arctiinae. The species was first described by Edward Meyrick in 1886. It is known from the Australian Capital Territory, New South Wales, Queensland, Western Australia, Victoria and South Australia.

The wingspan is about 20 mm. While the forewings are dull shades of grey, the hindwings are a vibrant orange. Females have vestigial wings.

The females look very similar to the larvae but bulkier. The females will stay with the eggs even after the males have mated and moved on. The females may nest on the golden wattle. When a female is removed from her nest she will begin clutching at the air, if on her back she is unable to right herself. The nest is constructed from a mesh of larval hairs. Females may become covered in a fluffy substance similar to that seem in some scale insects.

The larvae feed on lichens. The larvae are noted for being very hairy with spots of red and yellow.
