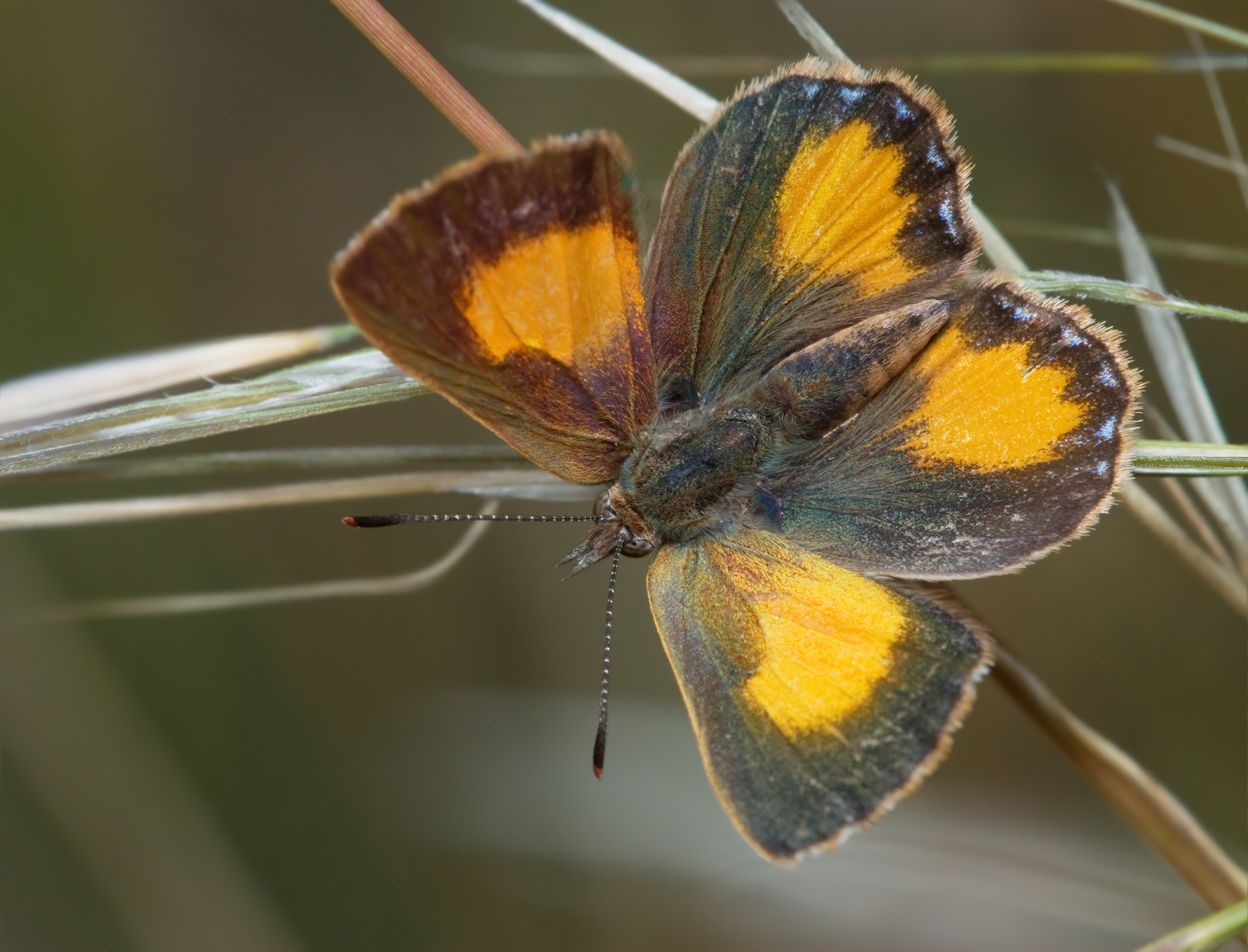
- Bright copper, Paralucia aurifera

Scientific classification
- Kingdom: Animalia
- Phylum: Arthropoda
- Clade: Pancrustacea
- Class: Insecta
- Order: Lepidoptera
- Family: Lycaenidae
- Tribe: Luciini
- Genus: Paralucia; Waterhouse & Turner, 1905

Species
- 3; see text

= Paralucia =

Butterfly genus in family Lycaenidae

Paralucia is a genus of butterflies endemic to Australia and belonging to the family Lycaenidae. The caterpillars feed on Bursaria and sometimes Pittosporum species and co-habit with ants of the genera Anonychomyrma and Notoncus.

== Species ==
The genus includes the following three species:

- Bright copper, Paralucia aurifera
- Fiery copper, Paralucia pyrodiscus
- Bathurst copper, Paralucia spinifera
