= Philip Ingamells =

Australian conservationist (1947–2023)

Philip Clark Ingamells (18 April 1947 – 25 August 2023) was an Australian conservationist, photographer, writer and advocate for the preservation of parks and wilderness areas who worked for the Victorian National Parks Association (VNPA).

== Early life and training ==
Philip Clark Ingamells was born 18 April 1947, brother of John and David, and nephew of historian Manning Clark whose house he designed while studying architecture at Melbourne University.

== Photographer ==
In 1970, Ingamells quit architecture and enrolled in photography at Prahran College under Paul Cox. There he specialised in landscape photography; it is likely that this interest led to his involvement in conservation. He contributed photography and writing to a number of magazine publications including the VPNA organ Park Watch and Wild, and to reports. He was photographer for the 1987 publication The Eltham Copper Butterfly that appeared concurrently with announcements of the rediscovery of remnants colonies of the Paralucia pyrodiscus hitherto presumed extinct, and for the 2015 Australian Alps: Kosciuszko, Alpine and Namadgi National Parks; and he published Discovering Mount Buffalo, and Discovering the Prom. In an interview recorded by Peter Leiss in 2017 Ingamells professed to using photography "to persuade people to protect natural areas."

== Conservationist ==
In the 1990s, Ingamells was a member of staff in the Community Education, Interpretation and Landscape Services Section of the Department of Conservation and Natural Resources, Victoria.

=== National parks ===
During his tenure with the Victorian National Parks Association Ingamells appeared frequently in the media, and made direct representation to governments; as Victorian National Parks Association spokesman in 2015 he publicly admonished the Victorian state government for its decrease in budget to parks, urging that the government needed urgently to reverse the drop in funding, not only to protect native plants and animals but also to recognize the economic contribution parks made to the state, saying; "Our parks already more than pay their way. "They contribute over $1 billion each year through tourism, $330 million in water services and $180 million in avoided health costs."

Ingamells spearheaded a long and hard-fought campaign to remove cattle grazing from the Alpine National Park, not once but twice. His dedication and resilience in the face of challenges made this victory possible. He was vocal in opposing development proposals within the national parks' estate, and emphasised the importance of preserving these areas in their pristine state; in the 1990s and again in 2012, he played a pivotal role in fending off development proposals for Wilsons Promontory. When plans were announced for construction of 31 buildings along Victoria's most popular alpine bushwalks he raised serious concerns. He pressed for government action to control feral animals that were intruding on Alpine habitats, highlighting the need to protect these fragile ecosystems.

=== Fire management ===
On the complex issue of fire management in natural landscapes, Ingamells, who had bitter personal experience of the human toll of fires, advocated for policies balancing safety and preserving natural heritage, and criticised crude burn-off targets, highlighting concerns about the overall amount of control burning in Victoria "damaging biodiversity, and often not helping to protect life and property." He convened a workshop sponsored by VNPA which prepared a submission to the 2009 Victorian Bushfires Royal Commission. In 2012 he presented a paper on the subject to the Royal Society of Victoria.

== Later life and legacy ==
From 2015, Ingamells served on the VicNature2050 Advisory Group and contributed to their publications: Symposium 1: Managing Victoria’s Biodiversity under Climate Change; Symposium 2: Our Changing Landscapes: Acting on Climate Impacts; Symposium 3: Building “Climate Future Plots”: designing trials to usefully inform management; and 10 things we can all do to help nature adapt to a new climate.

On 21 October 2015, Environment Victoria awarded Ingamells, then aged 68, with a Community Environment Award for 'outstanding commitment to safeguarding Victoria's environment'. His contributions to the history of management of the Australian Alps national parks are noted, and his environmental activism is acknowledged in the book Quiet Activism: Climate Action at the Local Scale. Ingamells in retirement lived in Castlemaine but continued to engage energetically with the conservation movement there.

Ingamells died at home in August 2023, at the age of 76. A public memorial took place in Eltham on 14 September.

== Publications ==
- Ingamells, Philip; Victorian National Parks Association; Taungurung Committee (2001), Discovering Mount Buffalo, Victorian National Parks Association, ISBN 978-1-875100-14-9
- Ingamells, Philip; Victorian National Parks Association (1999), Discovering the Prom (2nd ed.), Victorian National Parks Association, ISBN 978-1-875100-13-2
- Ingamells, Phil; Cameron, David, (Photographer); Victoria. Department of Conservation, Forests and Lands (1987), The Eltham Copper butterfly, Conservation Forests & Lands, Victoria
