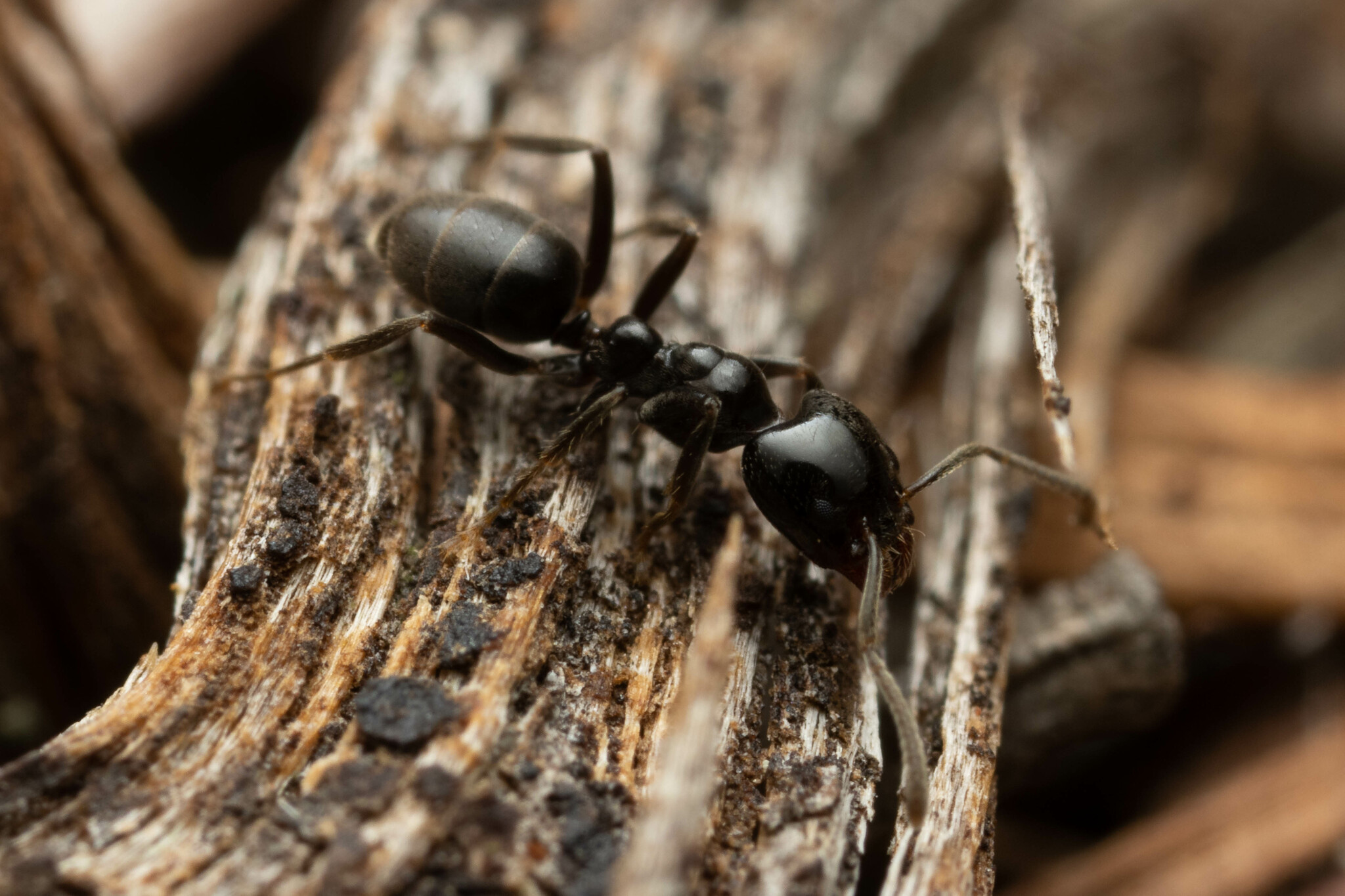

Scientific classification
- Kingdom: Animalia
- Phylum: Arthropoda
- Class: Insecta
- Order: Hymenoptera
- Family: Formicidae
- Subfamily: Dolichoderinae
- Genus: Anonychomyrma
- Species: A. nitidiceps

Binomial name
- Anonychomyrma nitidiceps (André, 1896)
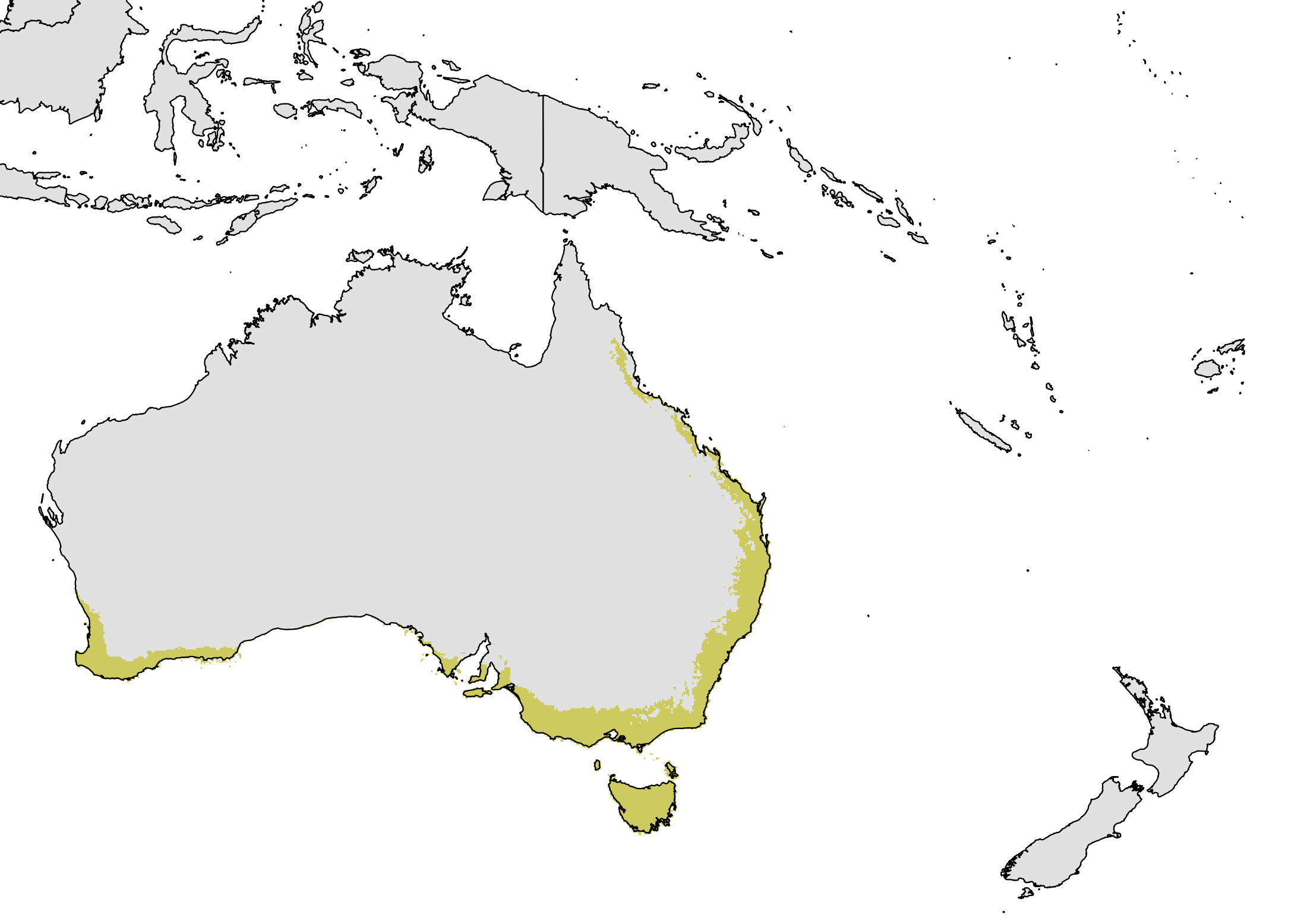

= Anonychomyrma nitidiceps =

Species of ant

Anonychomyrma nitidiceps is a species of ant in the subfamily Dolichoderinae. First described by the French entomologist Ernest André in 1896, the species is endemic to Australia.
