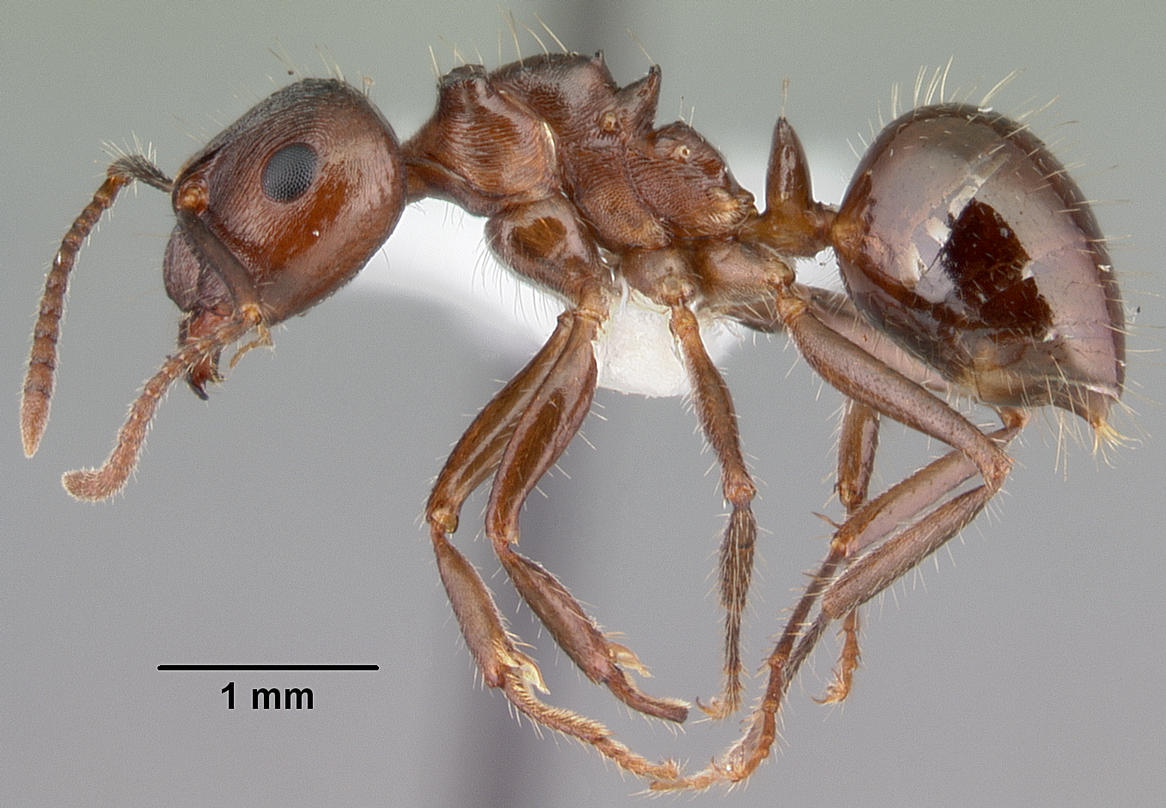
- Notoncus ectatommoides worker

Scientific classification
- Kingdom: Animalia
- Phylum: Arthropoda
- Class: Insecta
- Order: Hymenoptera
- Family: Formicidae
- Subfamily: Formicinae
- Tribe: Melophorini
- Genus: Notoncus; Emery, 1895

Type species
- Camponotus ectatommoides

Diversity
- 6 species

Synonyms
- Diodontolepis Wheeler, 1920

= Notoncus =

Genus of ants

Notoncus is an Australian genus of ants in the subfamily Formicinae. The genus is known from Australia (one species is also known from Papua New Guinea), where the ants nest in the soil or on the ground under stones and logs in forested areas. The ants are also common in gardens and parks.

== Species ==
The genus includes the following six species:

- Notoncus capitatus Forel, 1915
- Notoncus ectatommoides (Forel, 1892)
- Notoncus enormis Szabo, 1910
- Notoncus gilberti Forel, 1895
- Notoncus hickmani Clark, 1930
- Notoncus spinisquamis (Andre, 1896)
