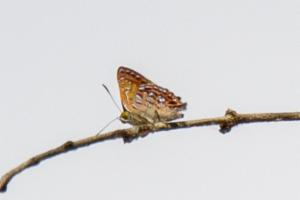

Scientific classification
- Kingdom: Animalia
- Phylum: Arthropoda
- Clade: Pancrustacea
- Class: Insecta
- Order: Lepidoptera
- Family: Lycaenidae
- Genus: Hypochrysops
- Species: H. piceatus

Binomial name
- Hypochrysops piceatus Kerr, Macqueen & Sands, 1969
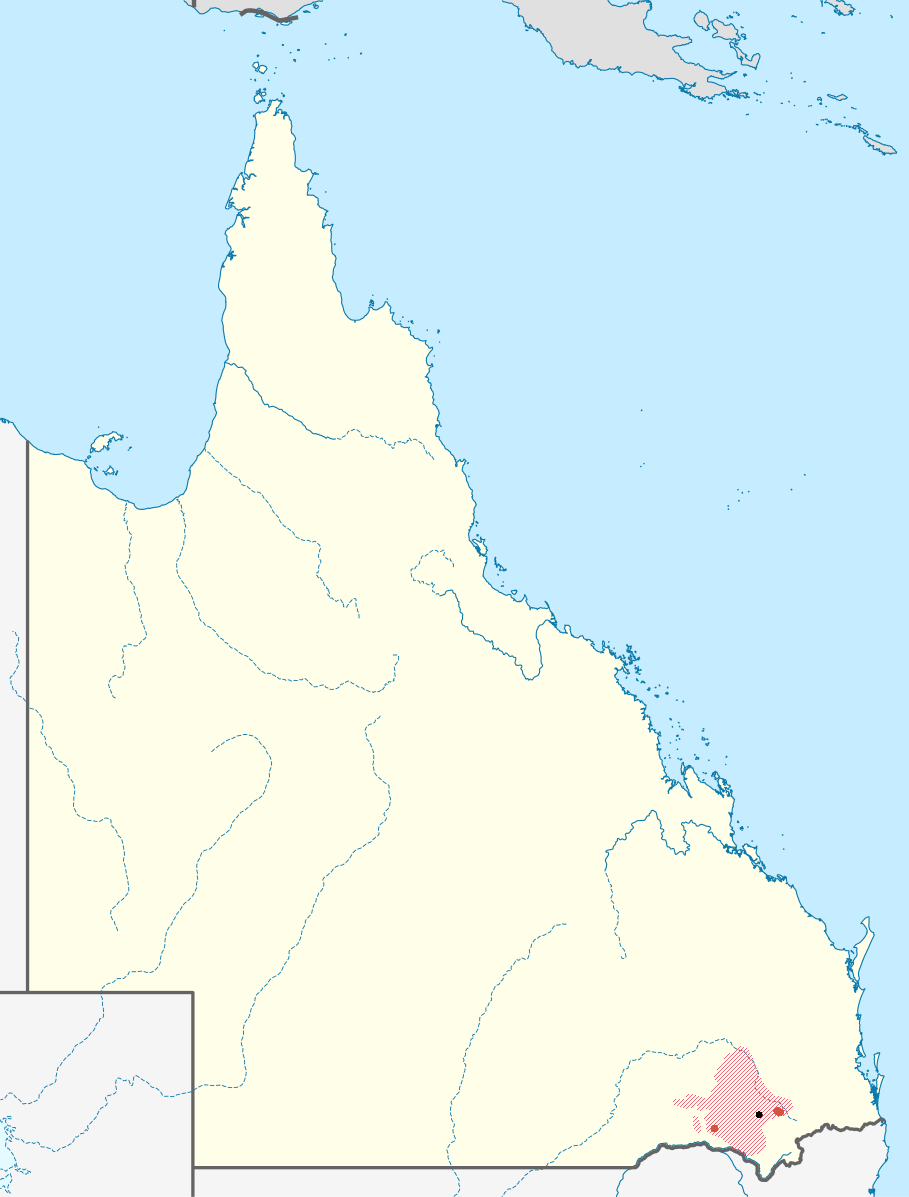
- Distribution of Hypochrysops piceatus Confirmed Probable; Extirpated (Mount Emlyn)

= Hypochrysops piceatus =

Bulloak jewel

Species of butterfly

Hypochrysops piceatus, commonly referred to as the bulloak jewel, is a species of butterfly in the family Lycaenidae endemic to Australia. It was first described in 1969 by John Kerr, Jack Macqueen, and Don Sands. It is restricted to two present localities under 10 km^{2} in area in Southeastern Queensland, with another locality's population extirpated due to land clearing. As a result, it has been described as "Australia's rarest butterfly", with an estimated 37% chance of extinction by 2040.

== Distribution ==
There were three sites that the bulloak jewel is found in, brought down to two currently. The two extant sites are in Leyburn (Ellangowan Nature Refuge) and Bendidee State Forest. Mount Emlyn, the location of the pastoral property of one of the original discoverers, Jack Macqueen, had its population extirpated due to subsequent extensive land clearing that had occurred. The known total area of occupancy for the bulloak jewel is under 10 square kilometres (3.9 mi^{2}) and is severely fragmented, with the remaining area's habitat declining in quality. The Ellangowan Nature Refuge, near Leyburn, is the primary centre of the bulloak jewel's population. The Ellangowan Nature Refuge was set up as a nature refuge under the provisions of the Queensland Nature Conservation Act 1992 specifically to preserve the Leyburn site's population of bulloak jewels.

The bulloak jewel is restricted to the southern Darling Downs in southeastern Queensland. In particular, the Brigalow Belt South Interim Biogeographic Regionalisation for Australia (IBRA) in low rainfall areas of below 600 millimetres (24 in).

=== Habitat ===
The bulloak jewel inhabits old-grown bulloak woodland consisting of the larval host tree of Allocasuarina luehmannii. It also inhabits mixed bulloak woodland of Angophora leiocarpa, Eucalyptus, and Callitris. The butterfly only prefers mature growth A. luehmannii, young trees and regrowth are not inhabited altogether.

== Conservation ==
Andrew Stafford writing for Guardian Australia dubbed the bulloak jewel as "arguably Australia's rarest butterfly", with the exception of the Australian fritillary (Argynnis hyperbius inconstans), which is believed to be extinct. Ann Jones writing for ABC Australia described it as "one of the rarest butterflies in the world." Geyle et al. describes it as "Australia’s most threatened butterfly".

Under the provisions of the Environment Protection and Biodiversity Conservation Act 1999 (EPBC Act), the bulloak jewel is listed as "Critically Endangered" as of 7 September 2023. In the state of Queensland it is listed as "Critically Endangered" under the provisions of Nature Conservation (Animals) Regulation 2020 as of December 2023. It is listed as "CR" under the provisions of Queensland's Nature Conservation Act 1992. It is one of six butterflies listed under the provisions of the EPBC Act.

Among the primary threats for the bulloak jewel are habitat degradation, fire, and insect collectors. It was estimated to have a 37 percentage chance of extinction by 2040. It was noted by Andrew Stafford for Guardian Australia that "a hot fire [in its native range] would be disastrous." Braby et al. named habitat degradation in the forms of increased drought and fire frequency, invasive weeds, land clearing (for grazing purposes or expansion of roadways and tracks), removal of dead and fallen trees which support ant trails (for use as firewood), rubbish dumping, and selective removal of mature A. luehmannii trees (to be processed into fence posts, firewood, turnery).

Conservation of the bulloak jewel is led by the Goondiwindi Bulloak Jewel Butterfly Project, a collaboration between the Goondiwindi Botanic Gardens, MacIntyre Ag Alliance, QMDCL Inglewood Aboriginal Rangers, and Queensland Trust For Nature, works in creating patches of habitat to create navigable spaces between known populations. Funding for the project was derived from a Queensland Government Community Sustainability Action grant.

Sands and Braby recommended the following recovery actions to be undertaken to ensure the survival of the bulloak jewel:

1. Field surveys to find additional populations of the bulloak jewel
2. Restoration of habitat by planting more bulloaks and ensuring natural recruitment
3. Protecting known breeding habitats permanently
4. Managing extant sites such as removing rubbish and preventing the illegal removal of trees and firewood

== Taxonomy ==
The bulloak jewel was first brought to scientific attention when Dr. John Kerr and a local farmer, Jack Macqueen, captured specimens near Leyburn, Queensland. It was first described as Hypochrysops piceata in John F. R. Kerr, Jack Macqueen, and Don P. Sands' 1969 "A new species of Hypochrysops (Lepidoptera: Lycaenidae) from south Queensland" published in the Journal of the Australian Entomological Society. In Dunn and Dunn's 1991 Review of Australian Butterflies: distribution, life history and taxonomy, it was moved to Hypochrysops piceatus which remains the current name. The change in specific epiphet reflected butterfly nomenclature compliant with the International Code of Zoological Nomenclature's (ICZN) Article 31.2, which recommended that the grammatical gender of the generic and specific epithets be in agreement.

The bulloak jewel is most closely related to Hypochrysops cyane, Hypochrysops epicurus, and Hypochrysops ignitus. H. cyane and H. epicurus are attended to the ant species Anonychomyrma, while H. ignitus is attended to by ants of the species Papyrius.

The common name is derived from the butterfly's food plant and the underwing patterns which resemble that of a jewel. Don Sands referred to its naming by stating that "it lives on the bulloak but it looks like a jewel". It is also known by the common names of Darling Downs jewel, bulloak jewel butterfly, bull-oak jewel, and piceatus jewel butterfly.

== Life history ==
The bulloak jewel butterfly prefers Allocasuarina luehmannii trees ranging between an estimated 100 to 200 years old. Saplings are also inhabited, but are suboptimal habitat for the larvae due to the absence of mature hollow branches that can sustain colonies of the attendant ant. The larvae are monophagous, feeding only on the leaves of A. luehmannii, the larvae are attended to by the ant Anonychomyrma inclinata. The attendant ant additionally attends to coccids, leafhoppers (Ipoini), and scale insects.

Every year, the bulloak jewel has two generations, with a flight period between late August to early May. The main emergence occurs in spring, and the secondary emergence occurs in the late summer to early autumn. Emergences varies from year to year, dependent on the rainfall. Male butterflies land on treetops or at the edges of trees (A. luehmannii or Angophora leiocarpa) during sunny periods to establish mating territories. Adults have been observed feeding on various plants including: Amyema spp., A. leiocarpa, Eucalyptus tereticornis, Jacksonia scoparia, Kunzea opposita, and some varieties of mistletoes.

The bulloak jewel's egg has a diameter of 0.8 millimetres (0.031 in). It is pale blue in colour and Braby et al. describes it as resembling a Mandarin orange in shape. There is a network of white, oblique ridges which form four deep-sided pits with upwardly pointed spines at the midsection. Eggs are deposited individually or in small clusters on mid-canopy stems of the host tree, near trails of the attendant ant. Eggs hatch within 6–7 days of deposition.

There are a total of seven instars from the beginning to the end of development. Unattended larvae are picked up by ants to be carried away, akin to other ant-attended members of the family Lycaenidae. Larvae at first feed on soft stem tissue, later instars feed on the needle-like branchlets. The immature stages of the bulloak jewel, per P.R. Samson, is described as most similar to Hypochrysops cyane.

In captivity, the larvae would pupate in concealed locations, including beneath bark and in rolled corrugated cardboard. Before pupation, the larva spins a silken platform which allows it to attach itself to the surface through anal hooks and a central silken girdle crossing through the abdominal segments. The period of time occurring while pupated was 18 days.
