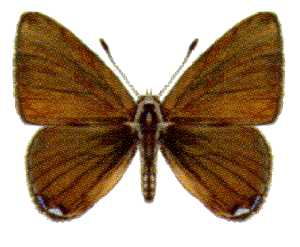

Scientific classification
- Domain: Eukaryota
- Kingdom: Animalia
- Phylum: Arthropoda
- Class: Insecta
- Order: Lepidoptera
- Family: Lycaenidae
- Genus: Acrodipsas
- Species: A. brisbanensis

Binomial name
- Acrodipsas brisbanensis Miskin, 1884

Synonyms
- Pseudodipsas brisbanensis

= Acrodipsas brisbanensis =

Species of butterfly

Acrodipsas brisbanensis, the bronze ant-blue or large ant-blue, is a butterfly of the family Lycaenidae. It is found in Australia.

The wingspan is about 20 mm.

The larvae feed on the larvae of the ant species Papyrius nitidus.

== Subspecies ==
- Acrodipsas brisbanensis brisbanensis (Cape York to New South Wales)
- Acrodipsas brisbanensis cyrilus (Victoria)
