= P. concinna =

P. concinna may refer to:

- Paracorixa concinna, a water boatman
- Parodia concinna, a flowering plant
- Perrinia concinna, a sea snail
- Petrogale concinna, an Australian macropod
- Phalaena concinna, a North American moth
- Phasianella concinna, a pheasant shell
- Philbertia concinna, a sea snail
- Phippsia concinna, an ice grass
- Physalacria concinna, a tropical fungus
- Pittoconcha concinna, a land snail
- Platycleis concinna, a shield-backed katydid
- Pleurothallis concinna, a bonnet orchid
- Polythore concinna, a New World damselfly
- Potentilla concinna, a flowering plant
- Prothyma concinna, a ground beetle
- Pseudemys concinna, a freshwater turtle
- Pteris concinna, a polypod fern
- Pterostylis concinna, a terrestrial orchid
