= Drymopsalta hobsoni =

Scientific classification
- Kingdom: Animalia
- Phylum: Arthropoda
- Clade: Pancrustacea
- Class: Insecta
- Order: Hemiptera
- Suborder: Auchenorrhyncha
- Family: Cicadidae
- Genus: Drymopsalta
- Species: D. hobsoni

Binomial name
- Drymopsalta hobsoni Ewart & Popple, 2013

Species of cicada

Drymopsalta hobsoni is a species of cicada, also known as the Inglewood heath-buzzer, in the true cicada family, Cicadettinae subfamily and Cicadettini tribe. It is endemic to Australia. It was described in 2013 by Australian entomologists Anthony Ewart and Lindsay Popple.

== Description ==
The length of the forewing is 10–13 mm.

== Distribution and habitat ==
The species is only known from a small forestry area near Inglewood in south-eastern Queensland. Its habitat is heathland and open forest with a heathy understorey, with the cicada populations associated with Kunzea opposita shrubs.

== Behaviour ==
Adults are heard from October to December, clinging to the stems of heath shrubs, uttering high-pitched calls characterised by a long buzz followed by soft chirps.
