= Ocean Grove =

Ocean Grove may refer to:

- Ocean Grove (band), an Australian metal band
- Ocean Grove, Victoria, a coastal town in Australia
- Ocean Grove, New Zealand, a suburb of Dunedin, New Zealand
- Ocean Grove, Massachusetts, a census-designated place in Swansea, Massachusetts, United States
- Ocean Grove, New Jersey, an unincorporated community in Neptune Township, New Jersey, United States

== See also ==
- Ocean Grove Nature Reserve
