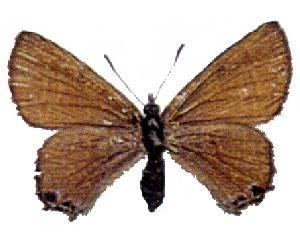

Scientific classification
- Domain: Eukaryota
- Kingdom: Animalia
- Phylum: Arthropoda
- Class: Insecta
- Order: Lepidoptera
- Family: Lycaenidae
- Genus: Acrodipsas
- Species: A. arcana

Binomial name
- Acrodipsas arcana Miller & Edwards, 1978

Synonyms
- Pseudodipsas arcana

= Acrodipsas arcana =

Species of butterfly

Acrodipsas arcana, the black-veined ant-blue or arcana ant-blue, is a butterfly of the family Lycaenidae. It is found inland on hills in southern Queensland and northern New South Wales in Australia.

Adults have a wingspan of about 20 mm. They are brown on top, with iridescent blue patches. The underside is brown, with dark white-edged arcs. Each hindwing has a pair of black spots on both the over- and underside.
