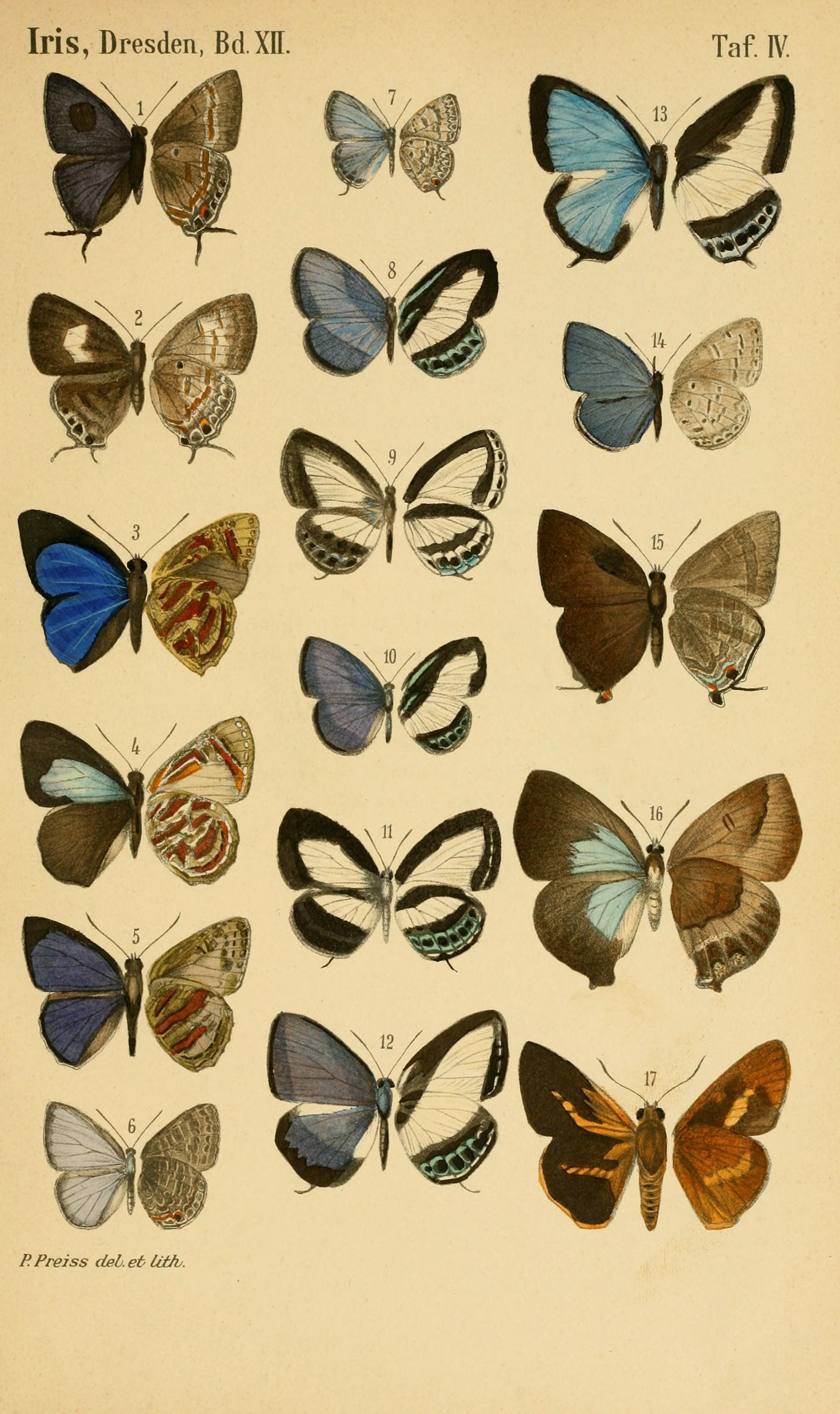

Scientific classification
- Domain: Eukaryota
- Kingdom: Animalia
- Phylum: Arthropoda
- Class: Insecta
- Order: Lepidoptera
- Family: Lycaenidae
- Genus: Hypochrysops
- Species: H. architas

Binomial name
- Hypochrysops architas H. H. Druce, 1891

= Hypochrysops architas =

Species of butterfly

Hypochrysops architas is a butterfly of the family Lycaenidae endemic to the Solomon Islands. It was first described by Hamilton Herbert Druce in 1891.

== Subspecies ==
- H. a. architas H. H. Druce, 1891 (Bougainville, Fauro)
- H. a. cratevas H. H. Druce, 1891 (Guadalcanal, Solomon)
- H. a. marie Tennent, 2001 (New Georgia, Solomon)
- H. a. seuthes H. H. Druce, 1891 (Malaita, Solomon)
