= Drymopsalta =

Scientific classification
- Kingdom: Animalia
- Phylum: Arthropoda
- Clade: Pancrustacea
- Class: Insecta
- Order: Hemiptera
- Suborder: Auchenorrhyncha
- Infraorder: Cicadomorpha
- Superfamily: Cicadoidea
- Family: Cicadidae
- Subfamily: Cicadettinae
- Genus: Drymopsalta; Ewart, 2005

Genus of cicadas

Drymopsalta is a genus of cicadas, also known as heath-buzzers, in the family Cicadidae, subfamily Cicadettinae and tribe Cicadettini. It is endemic to Australia. It was described in 2005 by Australian entomologist Anthony Ewart.

== Etymology ==
The genus name Drymopsalta is a combination derived from Greek drymo (woodland), with reference to the species’ favoured habitat, and psalta, a traditional suffix used in the generic names of many cicada species.

== Species ==
As of 2025 there were five described species in the genus:

- Drymopsalta acrotela Ewart & Popple, 2013 (Top End Heath-buzzer)
- Drymopsalta crepitum Ewart, 2005 (Cape York Heath-buzzer)
- Drymopsalta daemeli Distant, 1905) (Brown Heath-buzzer)
- Drymopsalta hobsoni Ewart & Popple, 2013 (Inglewood Heath-buzzer)
- Drymopsalta wallumi Ewart & Popple, 2013 (Wallum Heath-buzzer)
