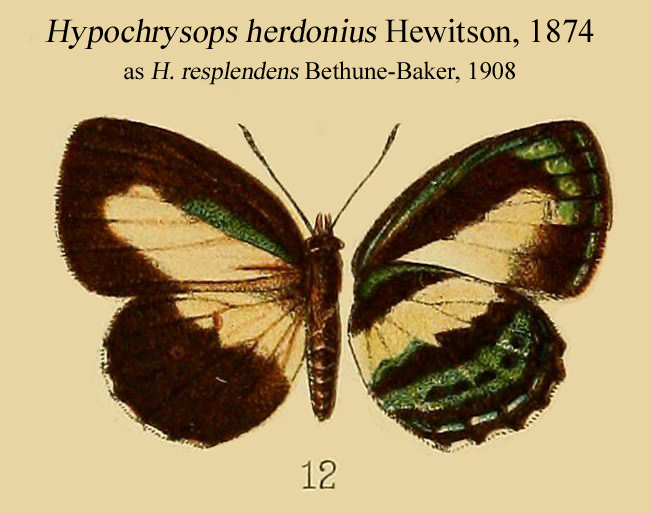

Scientific classification
- Domain: Eukaryota
- Kingdom: Animalia
- Phylum: Arthropoda
- Class: Insecta
- Order: Lepidoptera
- Family: Lycaenidae
- Genus: Hypochrysops
- Species: H. resplendens

Binomial name
- Hypochrysops resplendens (Bethune-Baker, 1908)

Synonyms
- Waigeum resplendens Bethune-Baker, 1908

= Hypochrysops resplendens =

Species of butterfly

Hypochrysops resplendens is a species of butterfly of the family Lycaenidae. It is found on Aru Islands. This specie of butterfly is a part of Hypochrysops genus, which include those butterflies that are known for their vibrant colors and intricate wing patterns.
