= Drymopsalta crepitum =

Scientific classification
- Kingdom: Animalia
- Phylum: Arthropoda
- Clade: Pancrustacea
- Class: Insecta
- Order: Hemiptera
- Suborder: Auchenorrhyncha
- Family: Cicadidae
- Genus: Drymopsalta
- Species: D. crepitum

Binomial name
- Drymopsalta crepitum Ewart, 2005

Species of cicada

Drymopsalta crepitum is a species of cicada, also known as the Cape York heath-buzzer, in the true cicada family, Cicadettinae subfamily and Cicadettini tribe. It is native to Australia. It was described in 2005 by Australian entomologist Anthony Ewart.

== Etymology ==
The specific epithet crepitum (Latin for a crackling or rattling sound) refers to the calls made by the cicadas.

== Description ==
The length of the forewing is 11–16 mm.

== Distribution and habitat ==
The species occurs in Far North Queensland from the tip of the Cape York Peninsula south-east to near Cooktown and south-west to Weipa and Normanton. The associated habitat is heathland, forest with understorey shrubs, and riparian communities.

== Behaviour ==
The cicadas are xylem feeders. Adults are heard from December to March, clinging to stems and branches, uttering high-pitched series of chirps punctuated by intervening “ticks”.
