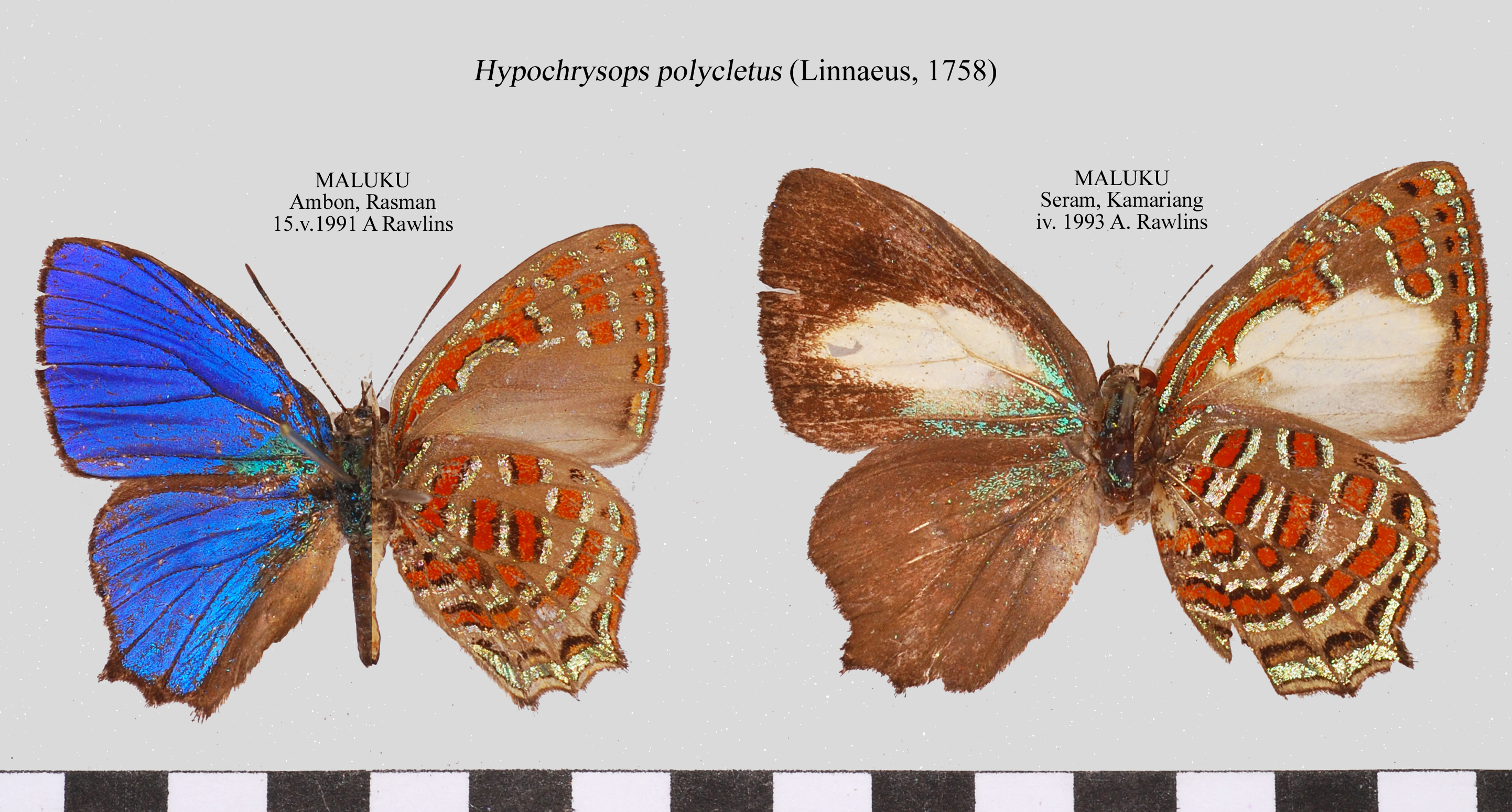
- Hypochrysops polycletus

Scientific classification
- Kingdom: Animalia
- Phylum: Arthropoda
- Class: Insecta
- Order: Lepidoptera
- Family: Lycaenidae
- Tribe: Luciini
- Genus: Hypochrysops; C. & R. Felder, 1860

Synonyms
- Waigeum Staudinger, 1895

= Hypochrysops =

Butterfly genus in family Lycaenidae

Hypochrysops is a genus of butterflies in the family Lycaenidae first described by Cajetan Felder and Rudolf Felder in 1860 and revised in 1986 by D. P. A. Sands.

The species of Hypochrysops certainly belong to the most beautiful Indo-Australian representatives of the family. The upper surface is more or less brilliant blue or reddish-violet, in the mostly somewhat duller tinged females sometimes white-spotted, in a number of species of a bright orange-yellow, usually with a black or black-brown margin which may vary greatly in width. The under surface always shows, on a yellow or dark grey-brown or even black ground, brilliant silvery-green or silvery-blue markings generally occurring in the hindwing as the bordering of brightly coloured, mostly red transverse bands and spots and being often still more salient by black margins.The species are mostly medium-sized, though there occur also smaller ones with an expanse of but 25 mm. Eyes naked, large; antennae of something more than half the length of the forewing, white-curled, the club long-stretched, gradually thickened, with a light-coloured tip. Palpi slender, straightly protruding, and projecting considerably beyond the forehead, laterally compressed, with appressed scales, the terminal joint short, in the shape of a thin staff. Wings broad; forewings triangular, costal margin moderately bent, distal margin straight or slightly bent, the apex sharply or slightly rounded, inner margin rectilinear; 11 veins (vein 9 being absent), 7 and 8 long-stalked, the fork placed rather close to the end. Hindwing somewhat longitudinally stretched, the costal margin bent flatly, the apex and distal margin strongly curved, the border uninterrupted or somewhat projecting at the veins 1 b to 3, sometimes at vein 3, rarely at vein 2 with a very much pronounced lobe, but never with real tail-appendages.

== Species ==
- Hypochrysops alyattes H. H. Druce, 1891 Solomon Islands
- Hypochrysops anacletus C. Felder, 1860 Indonesia
- Hypochrysops antiphon Grose-Smith, 1897 Papua
- Hypochrysops apelles Fabricius, 1775 Queensland

- H. a. singkepe D'Abrera, 1977 Lingga Archipelago

- Hypochrysops apollo Miskin, 1891 Queensland

- H. a. phoebus Waterhouse, 1928 Cape York
- H. a. wendisi Bethune-Baker, 1909 New Guinea

- Hypochrysops architas H. H. Druce, 1891

- H. a. cratevas H. H. Druce, 1891
- H. a. marie Tennent, 2001
- H. a. suethes H. H. Druce, 1891

- Hypochrysops aristocles Grose-Smith, 1898 Duke of York Island
- Hypochrysops argyriorufa van Eecke, 1924 Aru Islands Indonesia
- Hypochrysops arronica Felder, 1859 Aru Islands Indonesia
- Hypochrysops aurantiaca Yagishita, 2004 New Guinea
- Hypochrysops bakeri Joicey & Talbot, 1916 New Guinea
- Hypochrysops boisduvali Oberthür, 1894 Aru Islands Indonesia
- Hypochrysops byzos Boisduval, 1832

- H. b. hecalius Miskin, 1884 Victoria, Australia

- Hypochrysops calliphon Grose-Smith, 1894 New Guinea, Humboldt Bay.
- Hypochrysops castaneus Sands, 1986 New Guinea, Maprik
- Hypochrysops chrysanthis Felder, 1860  Indonesia, Maluku, Ambon.
- Hypochrysops chrysargyra Grose-Smith & Kirby, 1895
- Hypochrysops chrysodesmus Grose-Smith & Kirby, 1899 Indonesia, Waigeo
- Hypochrysops chrysotoxus Grose-Smith & Kirby, 1890 Papua New Guinea, Milne Bay
- Hypochrysops cleon Grose-Smith, 1900Papua New Guinea, Milne Bay
- Hypochrysops coelisparsus Butler, 1883 Nias Islands

- H. c. kerri Riley, 1932 Thailand

- Hypochrysops coruscans Grose-Smith, 1897 Dutch New Guinea

- H. c. subcaeruleum Grose-Smith & Kirby, 1896 Indonesia, Waigeo.
- H. c. ceramicum H. H. Druce, 1903 Indonesia, Maluku, Seram
- H. c. dinawa -Bethune-Baker, 1908 Papua New Guinea, Dinawa

- Hypochrysops cyane Waterhouse & Lyell, 1914 Queensland
- Hypochrysops delicia Hewitson, 1875

- H. d. delos Waterhouse & Lyell, 1914
- H. d. duaringae Waterhouse, 1903
- H. d. regina Grose-Smith & Kirby, 1895

- Hypochrysops dicomus Hewitson, 1874 Indonesia, Waigeo
- Hypochrysops digglesii Hewitson, 1874 Queensland
- Hypochrysops dinawa Bethune-Baker, 1908
- Hypochrysops dohertyi Oberthür, 1894 New Guinea
- Hypochrysops doleschallii Felder, 1860 Indonesia, Moluccas, Ambon.
- Hypochrysops elgneri Waterhouse & Lyell, 1909 Prince of Wales Island

- H. e. barnardi Waterhouse, 1934

- Hypochrysops emiliae D'Abrera, 1971 Papua
- Hypochrysops epicurus Miskin, 1876
- Hypochrysops eucletus Felder, 1865 Indonesia, Moluccas, Halmahera

- H. e. dyope Grose-Smith & Kirby, 1895 Papua
- H. e. eratosthenes Fruhstorfer, 1908 Papua, Sorong°
- H. e. menandrus Fruhstorfer, 1908 Papua, Waigeo.
- H. e. vulcanicus D'Abrera, 1971 Papua

- Hypochrysops eunice Fruhstorfer, 1915 Indonesia, Moluccas, Halmahera
- Hypochyrsops felderi Oberthür, 1894 Dutch New Guinea
- Hypochrysops ferruguineus Sands, 1986 New Britain
- Hypochrysops geminatus Sands, 1986 Papua New Guinea, Morobe District
- Hypochrysops halyaetus Hewitson, 1874
- Hypochrysops herdonius Hewitson, 1874 Indonesia, Moluccas , Aru
- Hypochrysops heros Grose-Smith, 1894 Papua, Humboldt Bay

- H. h. imogena D'Abrera, 1971 New Guinea, Karkar Island
- H. h. polemon Fruhstorfer, 1915 New Guinea

- Hypochrysops hippuris Hewitson, 1874 Indonesia, Molucca , Aru
- Hypochrysops honora Grose-Smith, 1898 New Guinea, New Hannover
- Hypochrysops hypates Hewitson, 1874 Kaioa Island, Moluccas, Indonesia

- H. h. zeuxis Staudinger, 1888 Halmaheira

- Hypochrysops ignita Leach, 1814 "New Holland"

- H. i. chrysonotus Grose-Smith, 1899 New Guinea, Milne Bay
- H. i. erythrina Waterhouse & Lyell, 1909 Darwin, Australia
- H. i. olliffi Miskin, 1889 Freemantle, Australia

- Hypochrysops lucilla D'Abrera, 1971 New Guinea, Tapini
- Hypochrysops luteus Sands, 1986 New Guinea, Telefomin
- Hypochrysops makrikii Ribbe, 1900 Indonesia, Moluccas, Seram.
- Hypochrysops meeki Rothschild & Jordan, 1905 New Guinea
- Hypochrysops mioswara Bethune-Baker, 1913 New Guinea, Mioswar Island
- Hypochrysops mirabillis Pagenstecher, 1894 Duke of York Island
- Hypochrysops miraculum H. H. Druce & Bethune-Baker, 1893 1893 Papua, Waigeo Island
- Hypochrysops miskini Waterhouse, 1903 Queensland
- Hypochrysops narcissus Fabricius, 1775
- Hypochrysops pagenstecheri Ribbe, 1899
- Hypochrysops piceatus Kerr, Macqueen & Sands, 1969
- Hypochrysops plotinus Grose-Smith, 1894 Papua, Humboldt Bay
- Hypochrysops polycletus Linnaeus, 1758Indonesia, Moluccas, Ambon

- H. p. atromarginata H. H. Druce, 1891 “Timor’’
- H. p. brunnea H. H. Druce, 1903 New Guinea, Fergusson Island
- H. p. epicletus Felder, 1859Indonesia, Moluccas, Aru
- H. p. hylaithus Fruhstorfer, 1908 "Offack, Dorei". Waigeo Island
- H. p. hypochrysops Oberthür, 1880
- H. p. kaystrus Fruhstorfer, 1908 New Guinea
- H. p. linos Fruhstorfer, 1908
- H. p. menyllus Fruhstorfer, 1908
- H. p. oineus Fruhstorfer, 1908
- H. p. rex Boisduval, 1832 New Guinea
- H. p. rovena H. H. Druce, 1891 Queensland

- Hypochrysops pratti Bethune-Baker, 1913 Papua
- Hypochrysops protogenes Felder, 1865 "Wagiou’’

- H. p. cleonides Grose-Smith, 1900
- H. p. hermogenes Grose-Smith, 1894
- H. p. pretiosus Grose-Smith, 1894 Indonesia, Biak Island
- H. p. thesaurus Grose-Smith, 1894

- Hypochrysops pyrodes Cassidy, 2003 Sulawesi
- Hypochrysops pythias Felder, 1865 Indonesia, Waigeo

- H. p. aurifer Grose-Smith, 1898 Fergusson Island
- H. p. drucei Oberthür, 1894 New Guinea, Geelvink Bay
- H. p. euclides Miskin, 1889 North Australia

- Hypochrysops resplendens Bethune-Baker, 1908
- Hypochrysops ribbei Röber, 1886 Papua, Sekar
- Hypochrysops rufimargo Rothschild, 1915 New Guinea, Vulcan Island
- Hypochrysops rufinus Grose-Smith, 1898 Papua, Roon Island
- Hypochrysops scintillans Butler, 1882 New Britain

- H. s. carveri D'Abrera, 1971
- H. s. carolina D'Abrera, 1971
- H. s. constancea D'Abrera, 1971
- H. s. squalliensis D'Abrera, 1971

- Hypochrysops simplex Grose-Smith & Kirby, 1896 Papua, Waigeu Island
- Hypochrysops siren Grose-Smith, 1894 Indonesia, Moluccas ,Halmahera
- Hypochrsops taeniata Jordan, 1908 Solomon Islands
- Hypochrysops thauma Staudinger, 1895 Papua, Waigeu Island
- Hypochrysops theon Felder, 1865 Indonesia, Moluccas, Halmahera

- H. t. alix Grose-Smith, 1900  Papua, Milne Bay.
- H. t. carmen Grose-Smith & Kirby, 1899 Papua, Roon Island
- H. t. medocus Fruhstorfer, 1908 Queensland
- H. t. theonides Grose-Smith, 1894 Papua, Roon Island
- H. t. theophanes Grose-Smith, 1894 Papua, Humboldt Bay

- Hypochrysops thesaurus Grose-Smith, 1894 Papua, Humboldt Bay
- Hypochrysops utyi Bethune-Baker, 1913 New Guinea

== Biogeography ==
Hypochrysops are found on each side of the Wallace line.

== Food sources ==
The mistletoe plant is ambiguously claimed to be a food source for at least some species of Hypochrysops.

This might be so, but raises some questions because most Lycaenidae have parasitic or mutualistic, often highly specific, relationships with various species of ants, and ants have been reported to carry the eggs of the Apollo jewel butterfly (Hypochrysops apollo apollo) into their colonies inside ant plants of the genus Myrmecodia. Myrmecodia species have certain superficial resemblances to "mistletoes", but are epiphytic, not markedly parasitic, and are not in any parasitic plant family; they are in fact in the coffee family, Rubiaceae. It seems likely that Hypochrysops apollo apollo at least, might feed exclusively on ant food and ant larvae.
