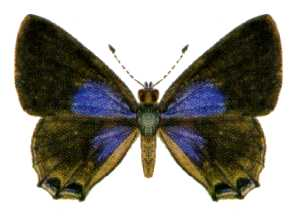

Scientific classification
- Domain: Eukaryota
- Kingdom: Animalia
- Phylum: Arthropoda
- Class: Insecta
- Order: Lepidoptera
- Family: Lycaenidae
- Genus: Acrodipsas
- Species: A. cuprea

Binomial name
- Acrodipsas cuprea Sands, 1965

Synonyms
- Pseudodipsas cuprea

= Acrodipsas cuprea =

Species of butterfly

Acrodipsas cuprea, the copper ant-blue or cuprea ant-blue, is a butterfly of the family Lycaenidae. It is found in Australia, from southern Queensland to Victoria.

The wingspan is about 20 mm.

The larvae feed on the larvae of Crematogaster ant species.
