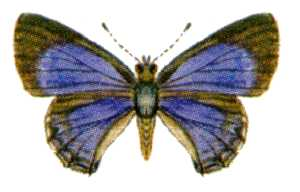
- Acrodipsas myrmecophila

Scientific classification
- Domain: Eukaryota
- Kingdom: Animalia
- Phylum: Arthropoda
- Class: Insecta
- Order: Lepidoptera
- Family: Lycaenidae
- Subfamily: Theclinae
- Tribe: Luciini
- Genus: Acrodipsas; Sands, 1980

Species
- See text

= Acrodipsas =

Butterfly genus in family Lycaenidae

Acrodipsas is a genus of butterflies in the family Lycaenidae. There are ten species in this genus all endemic to the Australasian realm:

- Acrodipsas arcana - black-veined ant-blue
- Acrodipsas aurata - golden ant-blue
- Acrodipsas brisbanensis - bronze ant-blue
- Acrodipsas cuprea - copper ant-blue
- Acrodipsas decima - Decima ant-blue
- Acrodipsas hirtipes - black ant-blue
- Acrodipsas illidgei - Illidge's ant-blue, mangrove ant-blue
- Acrodipsas melania - grey ant-blue
- Acrodipsas mortoni - brown ant-blue
- Acrodipsas myrmecophila - small ant-blue
- Acrodipsas violacea - violet ant-blue
