= Acrodipsas hirtipes =

Scientific classification
- Domain: Eukaryota
- Kingdom: Animalia
- Phylum: Arthropoda
- Class: Insecta
- Order: Lepidoptera
- Family: Lycaenidae
- Genus: Acrodipsas
- Species: A. hirtipes

Binomial name
- Acrodipsas hirtipes Sands, 1980

Species of butterfly

Acrodipsas hirtipes, the hirtipes ant-blue or black ant-blue, is a butterfly of the family Lycaenidae. It is found in the Northern Territory and on the Cape York Peninsula in Australia.

The wingspan is about 20 mm.
