= Drymopsalta daemeli =

Scientific classification
- Kingdom: Animalia
- Phylum: Arthropoda
- Clade: Pancrustacea
- Class: Insecta
- Order: Hemiptera
- Suborder: Auchenorrhyncha
- Family: Cicadidae
- Genus: Drymopsalta
- Species: D. daemeli

Binomial name
- Drymopsalta daemeli (Distant, 1905)

Species of cicada

Drymopsalta daemeli is a species of cicada, also known as the brown heath-buzzer, in the true cicada family, Cicadettinae subfamily and Cicadettini tribe. It is endemic to Australia. It was described in 1905 by English entomologist William Lucas Distant.

== Description ==
The length of the forewing is 10–13 mm.

== Distribution and habitat ==
The species has a limited range in New South Wales from near Taree south to Morton National Park and west to the Blue Mountains. The associated habitat is shrubby woodland and open heathland.

== Behaviour ==
Adults are heard from October to February, clinging to the stems of heath shrubs, uttering long, high-pitched, buzzing calls, followed by a series of chirps.
