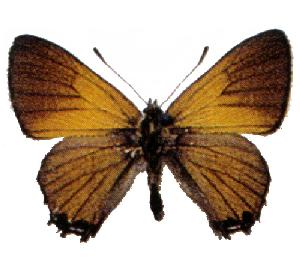

Scientific classification
- Domain: Eukaryota
- Kingdom: Animalia
- Phylum: Arthropoda
- Class: Insecta
- Order: Lepidoptera
- Family: Lycaenidae
- Genus: Acrodipsas
- Species: A. aurata

Binomial name
- Acrodipsas aurata Sands, 1997

= Acrodipsas aurata =

Species of butterfly

Acrodipsas aurata, the golden ant-blue, is a butterfly of the family Lycaenidae. It is found in the mountains of New South Wales and northern Victoria in Australia.

The wingspan is about 25 mm.
