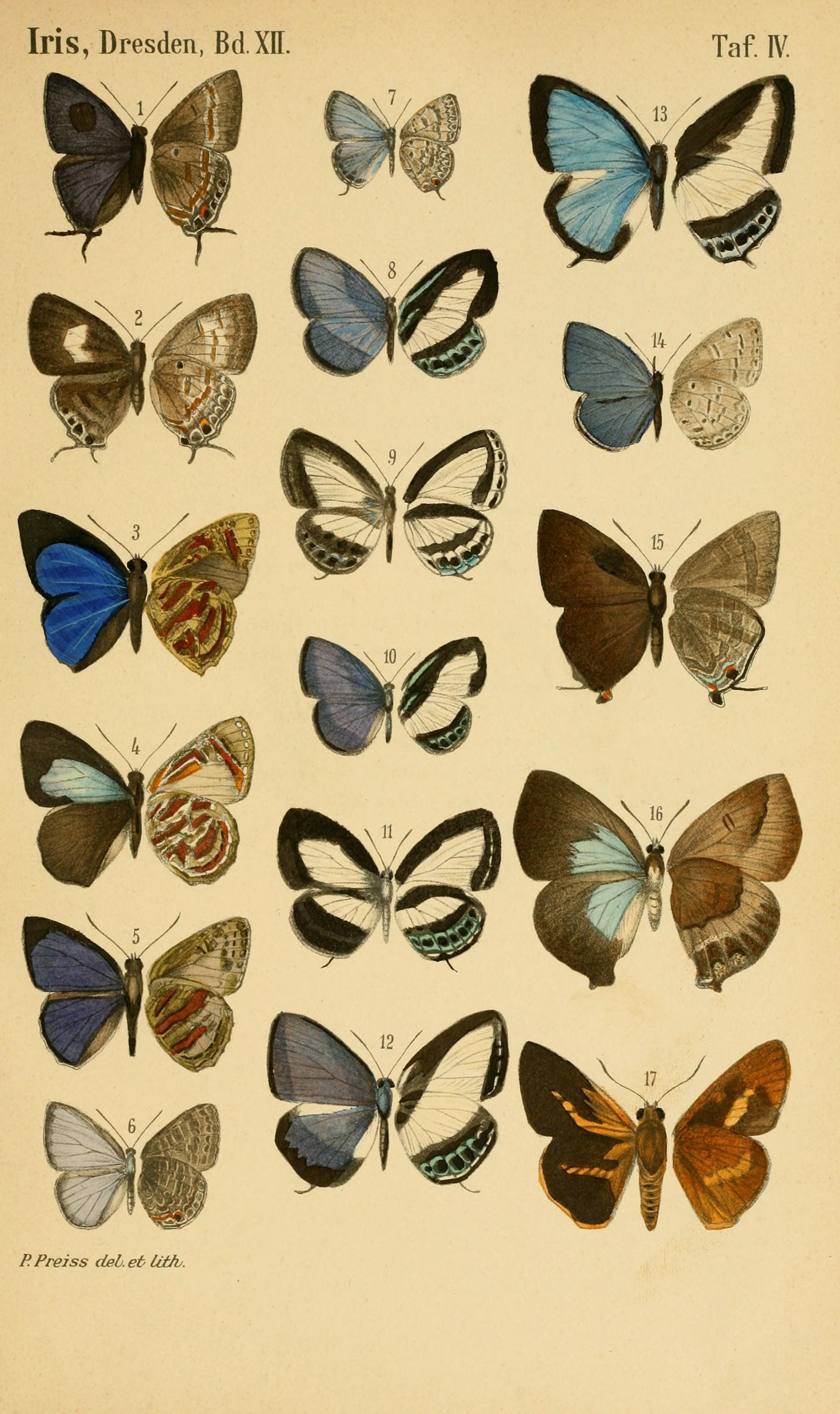
- plate accompanying original description

Scientific classification
- Domain: Eukaryota
- Kingdom: Animalia
- Phylum: Arthropoda
- Class: Insecta
- Order: Lepidoptera
- Family: Lycaenidae
- Genus: Hypochrysops
- Species: H. pagenstecheri

Binomial name
- Hypochrysops pagenstecheri Ribbe, 1899

= Hypochrysops pagenstecheri =

Species of butterfly

Hypochrysops pagenstecheri is a butterfly of the family Lycaenidae endemic to New Britain. The name honours Arnold Pagenstecher.
