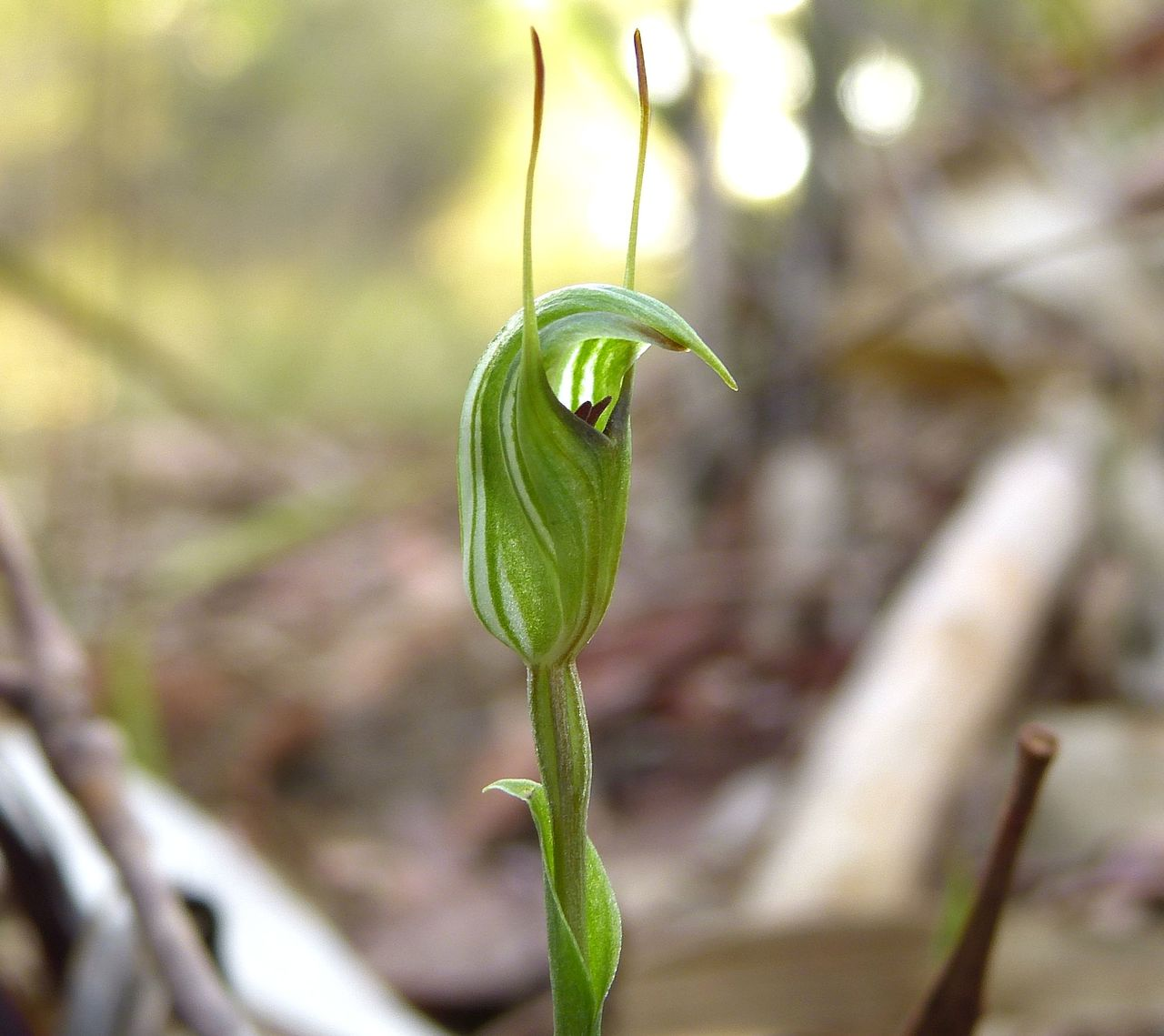
- Pterostylis concinna growing in Ocean Grove Nature Reserve

Scientific classification
- Kingdom: Plantae
- Clade: Tracheophytes
- Clade: Angiosperms
- Clade: Monocots
- Order: Asparagales
- Family: Orchidaceae
- Subfamily: Orchidoideae
- Tribe: Cranichideae
- Genus: Pterostylis
- Species: P. concinna

Binomial name
- Pterostylis concinna R.Br.

Synonyms
- Taurantha concinna (R.Br.) D.L.Jones & M.A.Clem.; Diplodium concinnum (R.Br.) M.A.Clem. & D.L.Jones

= Pterostylis concinna =

Trim greenhood

Species of orchid

Pterostylis concinna, commonly known as the trim greenhood, is a species of orchid endemic to south-eastern Australia and which usually grows in colonies. It has a rosette of leaves at the base and a single dark green, white and orange-red flower.

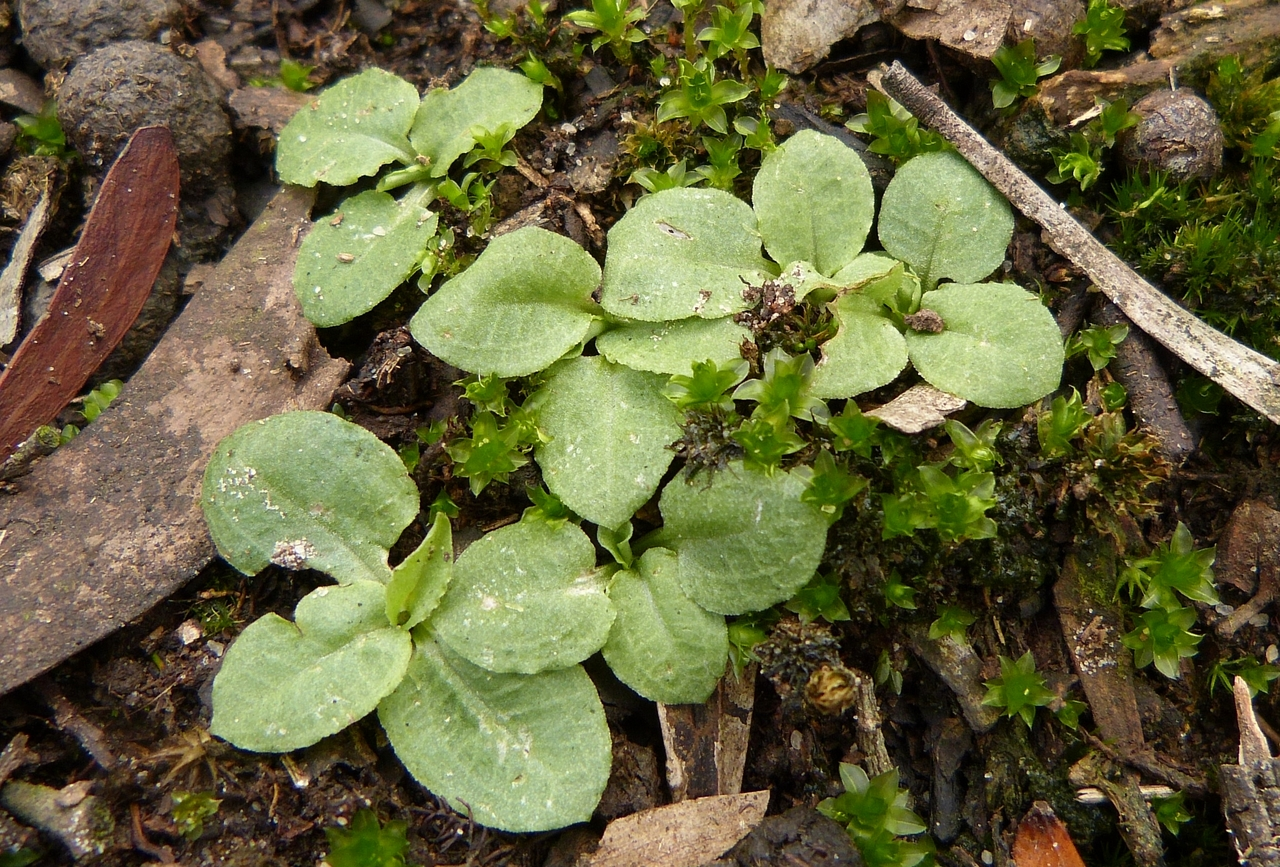
Pterostylis concinna leaf rosette

== Description ==
Pterostylis concinna has a rosette of between four and ten dark green, egg-shaped to oblong leaves, each leaf 6–30 mm (0.2–1 in) long and 5–15 mm (0.2–0.6 in) wide. A single dark green and white flower with an orange-red to brownish tip is borne on a flowering spike 80–300 mm (3–10 in) high. The flowers are 12–15 mm (0.5–0.6 in) long, 6–9 mm (0.2–0.4 in) wide. The dorsal sepal and petals are joined and curve forward forming a hood called the "galea" over the column but the dorsal sepal is longer than the petals. The pointed tip of the dorsal sepal is 2–3 mm (0.08–0.1 in) and the lateral sepals are pressed against the galea. There is a broad, flat sinus between the lateral sepals which have erect, thread-like tips 14–20 mm (0.6–0.8 in) long. The labellum is 7–10 mm (0.3–0.4 in) long, about 4 mm (0.2 in) wide, curved and brown with a notch on the end, and is just visible behind the sinus. Flowering occurs between May and October.

== Taxonomy and naming ==
Pterostylis concinna was first described in 1810 by Robert Brown and the description was published in Prodromus Florae Novae Hollandiae et Insulae Van Diemen. The specific epithet (concinna) is a Latin word meaning "skilfully put together", "beautiful" or "appropriate".

== Distribution and habitat ==
The trim greenhood is found in New South Wales south of Mudgee and is widespread and locally common in Victoria. It also grows in Tasmania but in only two colonies in South Australia. It grows in moist forest and coastal scrub, often in sandy soil.
