= Drymopsalta wallumi =

Scientific classification
- Kingdom: Animalia
- Phylum: Arthropoda
- Clade: Pancrustacea
- Class: Insecta
- Order: Hemiptera
- Suborder: Auchenorrhyncha
- Family: Cicadidae
- Genus: Drymopsalta
- Species: D. wallumi

Binomial name
- Drymopsalta wallumi Ewart & Popple, 2013

Species of cicada

Drymopsalta wallumi is a species of cicada, also known as the wallum heath-buzzer, in the true cicada family, Cicadettinae subfamily and Cicadettini tribe. It is endemic to Australia. It was described in 2013 by Australian entomologists Anthony Ewart and Lindsay Popple.

== Description ==
The length of the forewing is 11–13 mm.

== Distribution and habitat ==
The species occurs in coastal areas of south-eastern Queensland and north-eastern New South Wales. Its habitat is wallum heathland, with the cicada populations associated with Leptospermum shrubs.

== Behaviour ==
Adults are heard from September to January, clinging to the stems of heath shrubs, uttering soft, high-pitched, chirping calls.
