= Geelong Field Naturalists Club =

Australian regional amateur scientific natural history and conservation society

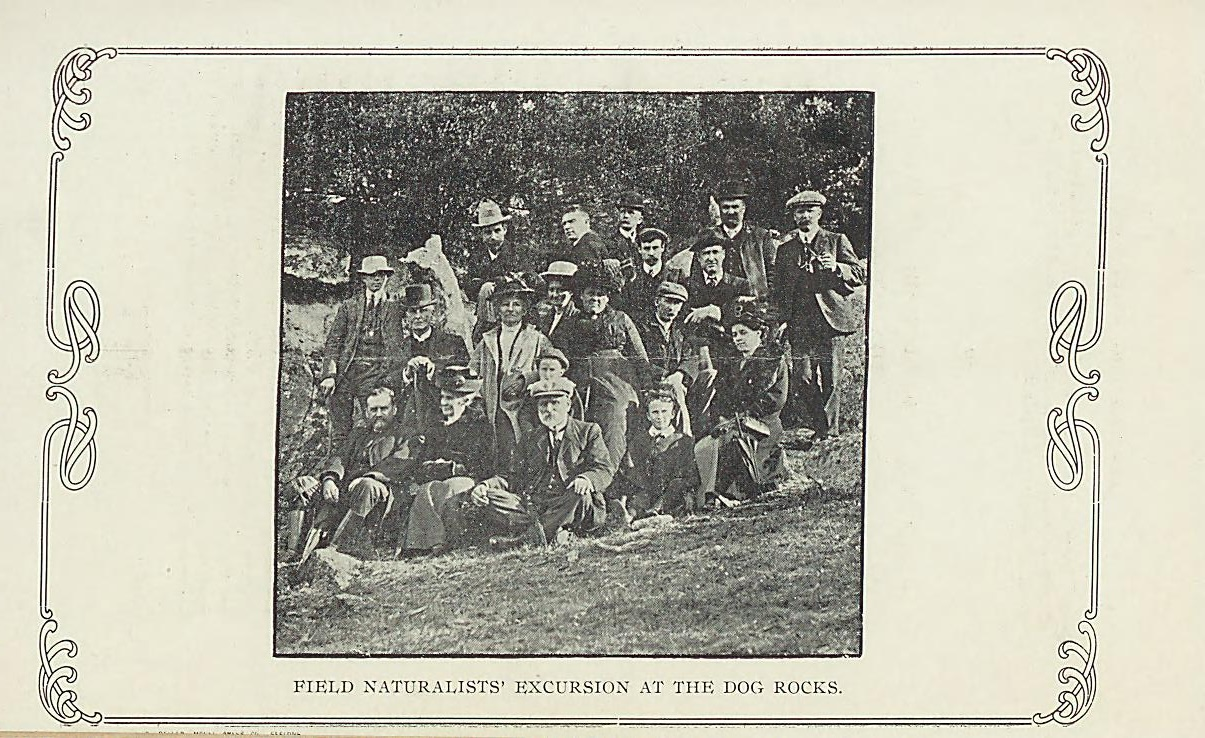
The Geelong Field Naturalists' Club Excursion to Dog Rocks, 12 August 1911

The Geelong Field Naturalists Club (GFNC) is an Australian regional amateur scientific natural history and conservation society which was originally founded in the 1890s and re-established in 1961 in its present form. It is based in Geelong, Victoria, with the aims of preserving and protecting native flora and fauna, promoting the conservation of natural resources and the protection of endangered species and habitats, and recording information and knowledge about the flora and fauna of the Geelong region.

The logo of the club features the small ant-blue butterfly (Acrodipsas myrmecophila, syn Pseudodipsas myrmecophila), an endangered myrmecophilous species once found in the Ocean Grove Nature Reserve.

== Current activities ==
The GFNC holds monthly face-to-face and online meetings from February to December. In these meetings, the club invites a guest speaker to present on a topic related to natural history or conservation. Field trips are held at least once a month and are regularly hosted by experts in the local area. During these excursions, club members observe and record details of flora, fauna, geology and history of various locations in the Geelong region. These excursions are occasionally attended by members of other local field naturalists' clubs, as well as conservationist community groups, including Geelong Sustainability.

The club has a long history of lobbying government bodies in support of legislation to protect native species and Australian biodiversity. This is exemplified by the club's 2020 submission to the Environment Protection and Biodiversity Conservation Act 1999 Review, in which they request mechanisms are put in place to better use citizen scientific knowledge and reach out to community organisations when investigating changes to biodiverse regions.

The GFNC sponsors The Margery Rix Environment Scholarship to Gordon Institute of TAFE conservation and land management students, with the aim of encouraging students to pursue a career in conservation and land management in the Geelong region.

The club is a member of the South East Australian Naturalists Association, and has previously hosted several of the association's biannual naturalist club camps. The GFNC is also a member of the Australian Naturalists' Network.

== History ==
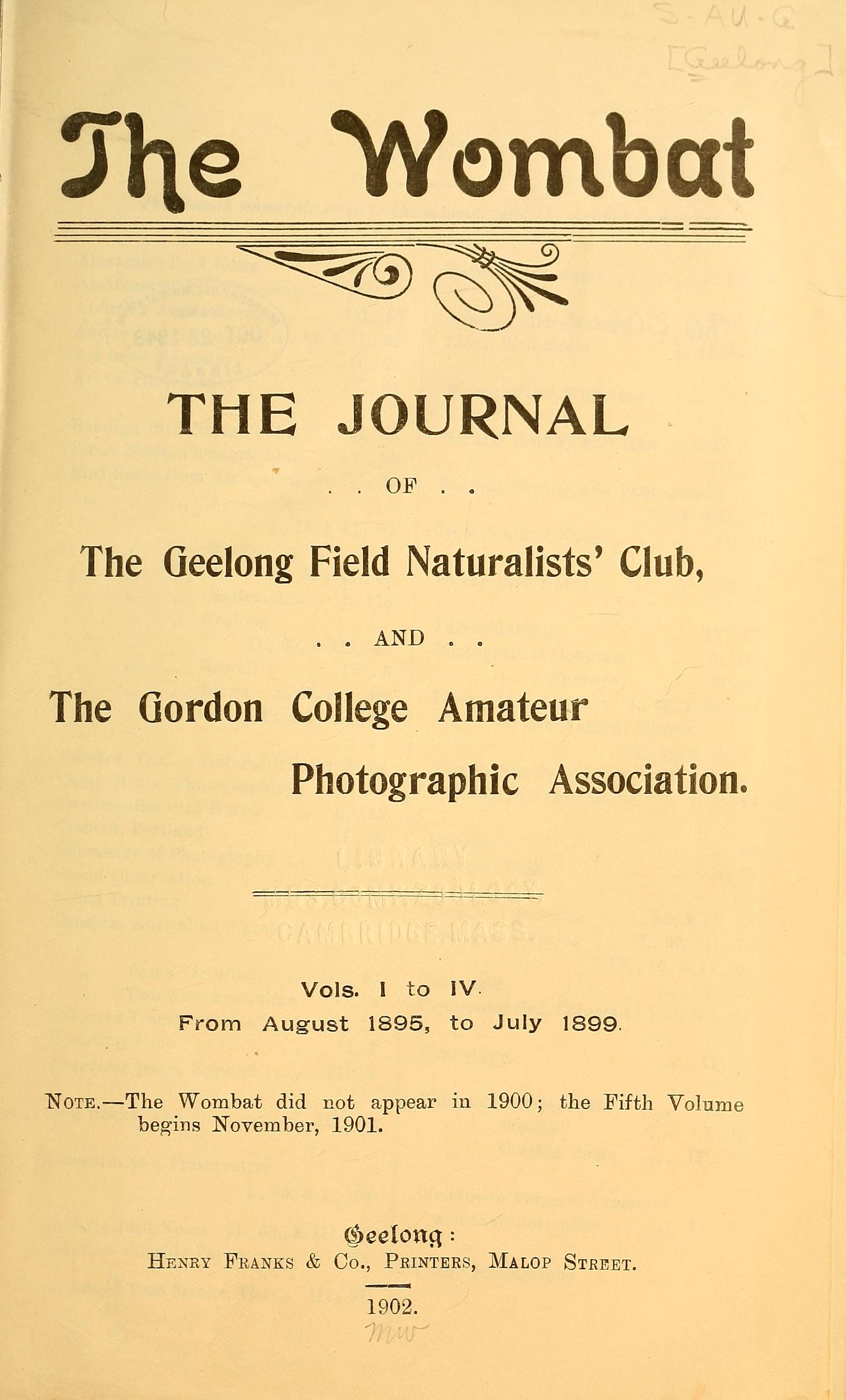
The title page of The Wombat: Journal of the Geelong Field Naturalists' Club Vols. I to IV, August 1895 to July 1899

The Geelong region has a long history of conservation work, with a naturalist club, also named the Geelong Field Naturalists Club, meeting in the area from 1880 till their conclusion of activities in 1932. This club was the second field naturalist club founded in Victoria.

In this time, the club produced two serial publications, The Geelong Naturalist: The Journal of the Geelong Field Naturalists' Club (1891–1931) and The Wombat: Journal of the Geelong Field Naturalists' Club (1895–1902). The club was also responsible for the first Nature Study Exhibition of the Gordon Technical College in 1884, awarding school students with scholarships to undertake education in horticulture.

The modern Geelong Field Naturalists Club was founded in 1961 by Australian naturalist Trevor Pescott and several other Geelong locals. Pescott served as president for three years and edited the Geelong Naturalist.

The GFNC and president at the time, Jack Wheeler, were instrumental in the early 1960s in establishing the Ocean Grove Nature Reserve.

== Publications ==
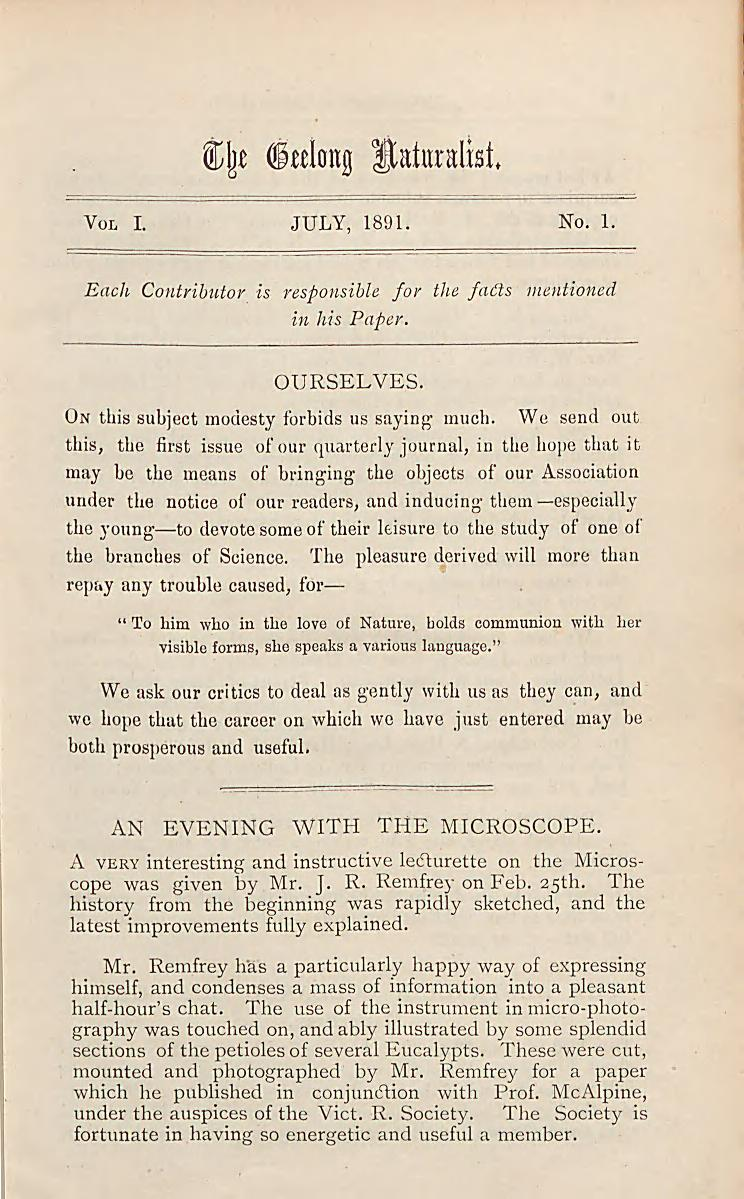
The first page of the first issue of The Geelong Naturalist, published in July 1891

The first issue of The Geelong Naturalist was published in July 1891, and began with the following introduction:

We send out this, the first issue of our quarterly journal, in the hope that it may be the means of bringing the objects of our Association under the notice of our readers, and inducing them — especially the young — to devote some of their leisure to the study of one of the branches of Science. The pleasure derived will more than repay any trouble caused...”

The GFNC has published several serial publications, including the monthly Geelong Naturalist: Journal of the Geelong Field Naturalists' Club (1964–1995), and the, now quarterly, Geelong Naturalist: monthly magazine of the Geelong Field Naturalists Club (1994–). The GFNC publishes the serial Geelong Bird Report (1991–2016) and books on the natural history of the Geelong region, including:

- Orchids of the Anglesea District by Foster, E. & MacDonald, M. (1999)
- Field and Lane by Pescott, T. (1976)
- The Otway by Pescott, T. (1976)
- The You Yangs Range by Pescott, T. (1995)
- Geelong's Birdlife in Retrospect - A selection of Geelong Advertiser articles by Pescott, T. ed. and P. J. Wood. Belmont (1996)
- Wildflowers of the Brisbane Ranges by Trigg, C. & Trigg, M.
