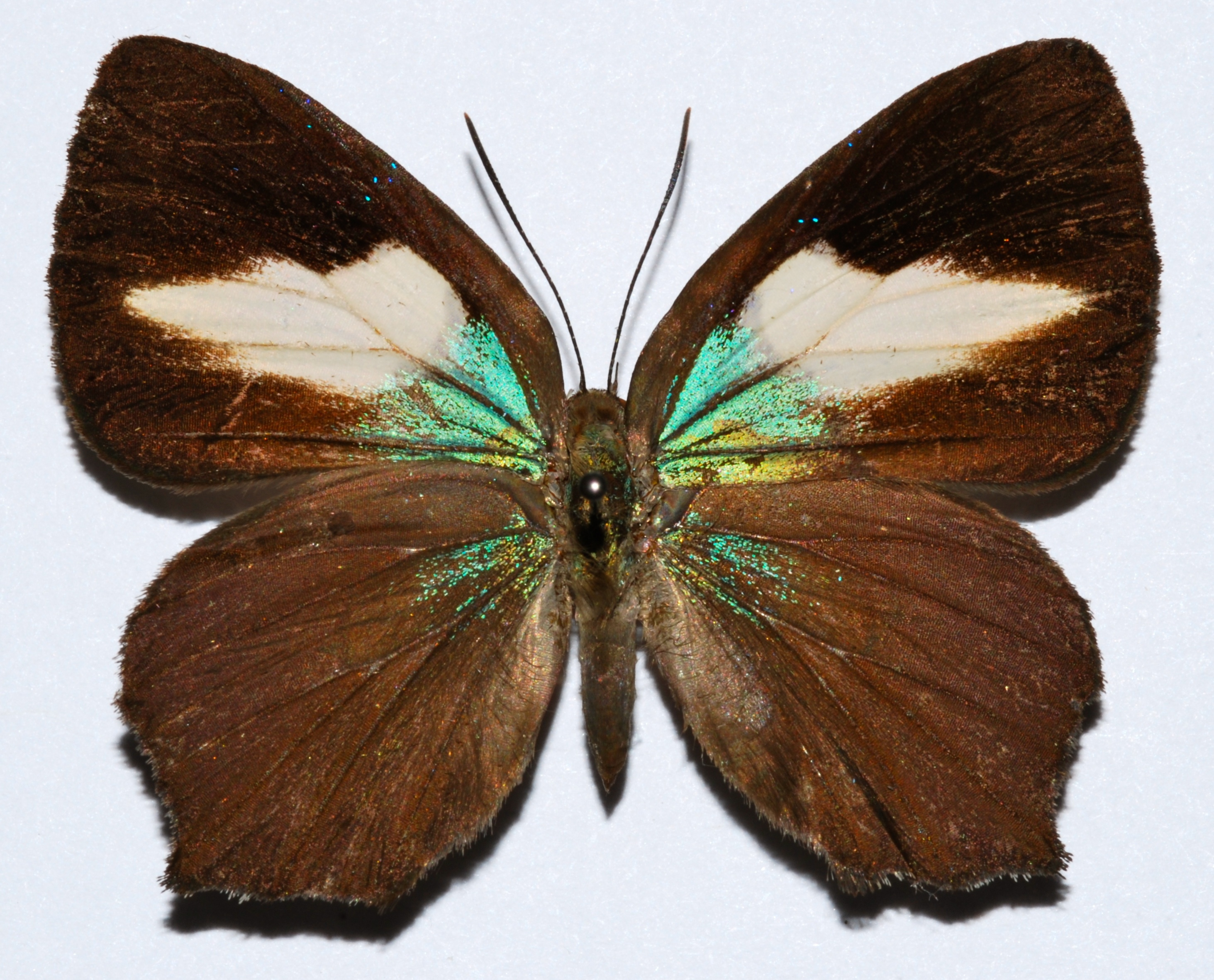

Scientific classification
- Kingdom: Animalia
- Phylum: Arthropoda
- Clade: Pancrustacea
- Class: Insecta
- Order: Lepidoptera
- Family: Lycaenidae
- Genus: Hypochrysops
- Species: H. polycletus

Binomial name
- Hypochrysops polycletus (Hewitson, 1865)

Synonyms
- Amblypodia polycletus Hewitson, 1865

= Hypochrysops polycletus =

Species of butterfly

Hypochrysops polycletus is a species of butterfly in the family Lycaenidae and the subfamily Lycaeninae. It is endemic to northeastern Australia and occurs in coastal and subcoastal Queensland. The species belongs to the genus Hypochrysops, a group of Australasian hairstreak butterflies known for their metallic coloration and frequent associations with ants.

== Description ==
Adults have a wingspan of approximately 25–35 mm (1.0–1.4 in). Males typically exhibit bright metallic blue upperwings with narrow dark margins. Females have broader dark borders. The ventral surface is pale grey to brownish with complex transverse bands and spots, providing camouflage when the butterfly is at rest.

== Taxonomy ==
The species was first described by William Chapman Hewitson in 1865 as Amblypodia polycletus. The original description was based on material from northeastern Australia. Early taxonomic treatments placed the species within Amblypodia, a broadly defined genus later subdivided as lycaenid systematics were revised. Subsequent revisions transferred the species to the genus Hypochrysops, where it is currently placed within the subfamily Theclinae. Modern classifications follow the arrangement adopted in major Australian butterfly references.

== Type locality ==
Hewitson's original material was reported from northeastern Australia. Subsequent interpretation of the type series indicates a Queensland origin, consistent with the species' modern documented distribution.

== Distribution and habitat ==
Hypochrysops polycletus is found in northeastern Queensland, Australia as well as Western New Guinea, Papua New Guinea, and Moluccas. Occurrence records compiled by the Atlas of Living Australia and the Global Biodiversity Information Facility confirm its presence in coastal and subcoastal regions of the state. Habitats include tropical rainforest margins, wet sclerophyll forest, and adjacent woodland. The species is typically localised and associated with the distribution of its larval host plants and attendant ants.

== Biology ==
The larvae are myrmecophilous and form mutualistic associations with ants, a widespread trait among lycaenid butterflies. Recorded larval host plants include mistletoes in the family Loranthaceae, particularly species of Amyema. Adults are most frequently observed during warmer months and feed on floral nectar.
