= Bendidee National Park =

National park in Queensland, Australia

- IUCN category II (national park)
- Location within Queensland
- Location: Queensland
- Nearest city: Goondiwindi
- Coordinates: 28°18′01″S 150°31′04″E
- Area: 9.3 km^{2} (3.6 sq mi)
- Established: 1979
- Governing body: Queensland Parks and Wildlife Service

Bendidee is a national park in the Goondiwindi Region, Queensland, Australia.

== Geography ==
The park is north east of Goondiwindi on the Darling Downs, 264 km west of Brisbane. The park is part of the Brigalow Belt South bioregion and lies within the water catchment areas of the Macintyre and Weir rivers. The park was established to conserve an area of remaining brigalow–belah plant communities. Bendidee State Forest is adjacent to the national park to its north. The elevation of the terrain is 245 metres.

== Fauna ==
A total of five rare or threatened species have been identified within the park. 30 amphibians and reptiles as well as more than 89 invertebrates have been found at Bendidee, including the endangered Bull oak jewel butterfly. The most interesting inhabitants of the park are the legless lizard (Paradelma orientalis) and the small Dwyer's Hooded Snake (Parasuta dwyeri).

== Amenities ==
The park provides for walking, bird watching and nature appreciation activities.

== See also ==
- Protected areas of Queensland
