= Acrodipsas decima =

Scientific classification
- Domain: Eukaryota
- Kingdom: Animalia
- Phylum: Arthropoda
- Class: Insecta
- Order: Lepidoptera
- Family: Lycaenidae
- Genus: Acrodipsas
- Species: A. decima

Binomial name
- Acrodipsas decima Miller and Lane, 2004

Species of butterfly

Acrodipsas decima, the Decima ant-blue, is a butterfly of the family Lycaenidae. It is found in a small area of the Northern Territory in Australia.

The wingspan is about 20 mm.
