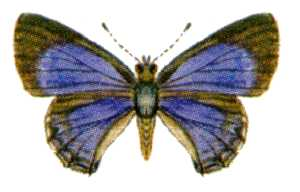

Scientific classification
- Domain: Eukaryota
- Kingdom: Animalia
- Phylum: Arthropoda
- Class: Insecta
- Order: Lepidoptera
- Family: Lycaenidae
- Genus: Acrodipsas
- Species: A. myrmecophila

Binomial name
- Acrodipsas myrmecophila Waterhouse & Lyell, 1913

Synonyms
- Pseudodipsas myrmecophila

= Acrodipsas myrmecophila =

Species of butterfly

Acrodipsas myrmecophila, the small ant-blue, is a butterfly of the family Lycaenidae. It is found in the south-east of Australia.

The wingspan is about 25 mm. The larvae feed on the larvae of the ant species Papyrius nitidus. The butterfly features on the logo of the Geelong Field Naturalists Club.
