= Acrodipsas mortoni =

Scientific classification
- Domain: Eukaryota
- Kingdom: Animalia
- Phylum: Arthropoda
- Class: Insecta
- Order: Lepidoptera
- Family: Lycaenidae
- Genus: Acrodipsas
- Species: A. mortoni

Binomial name
- Acrodipsas mortoni Sands, Miller & Kerr, 1997

Species of butterfly

Acrodipsas mortoni, the brown ant-blue, is a butterfly of the family Lycaenidae. It is found in inland New South Wales and southern Queensland in Australia.
