= Drymopsalta acrotela =

Scientific classification
- Kingdom: Animalia
- Phylum: Arthropoda
- Clade: Pancrustacea
- Class: Insecta
- Order: Hemiptera
- Suborder: Auchenorrhyncha
- Family: Cicadidae
- Genus: Drymopsalta
- Species: D. acrotela

Binomial name
- Drymopsalta acrotela Ewart & Popple, 2013

Species of cicada

Drymopsalta acrotela is a species of cicada, also known as the Top End heath-buzzer, in the true cicada family, Cicadettinae subfamily and Cicadettini tribe. It is endemic to Australia. It was described in 2013 by Australian entomologists Anthony Ewart and Lindsay Popple.

== Description ==
The length of the forewing is 10–13 mm.

== Distribution and habitat ==
The species is known only from the Top End of the Northern Territory, from Litchfield National Park eastwards to Kakadu National Park, in the Darwin Coastal bioregion. Its habitat is shrubby Callitrix woodland on sandstone.

== Behaviour ==
Adults have been recorded in November, clinging to the stems and branches of Callitrix shrubs, uttering high-pitched calls characterised by a long buzz followed by a series of chirps and a soft terminal “tick”.
