= Trevor Pescott =

Australian naturalist, conservationist and writer

Trevor William Pescott (born 1934) is an Australian naturalist, conservationist and writer, based in Geelong, Victoria. He was born in Ballarat and educated in Geelong, qualifying with a Diploma of Civil Engineering from the Gordon Institute of Technology. He was subsequently employed as a municipal engineer with the Shire of Corio until his retirement.

Pescott was instrumental in the reestablishment of the Geelong Field Naturalists Club in 1961, serving as its president for three years and editing its magazine, the Geelong Naturalist. From 1960 he wrote a weekly column (By Field and Lane) in the Geelong Advertiser. He has been a regional representative to the Royal Australasian Ornithologists Union and a foundation committee member of the Environment Studies Association of Victoria. In 1973 he was involved in the formation of the Geelong Environment Council. In 1982 Deakin University awarded him an honorary Master of Science degree.

In 1983 Pescott was awarded the Australian Natural History Medallion.

== Bibliography ==
As well as numerous articles in magazines and journals, books authored and edited by Pescott include:

- 1976 - By Field and Lane. Neptune Press: Geelong.
- 1978 - Natural Victoria. Rigby: Australia.
- 1983 - Birds of Geelong. Neptune Press: Geelong.
- 1987 - From Buckleys to the Break. A history and natural history of the Barwon River through Geelong. Geelong Field Naturalists Club: Geelong. (Editor, with Valda Dedman and Gordon McCarthy).
- 1995 - The You Yangs Range. Yaugher Print: Geelong.
- 1996 - Geelong’s Birdlife in Retrospect. A selection of Geelong Advertiser articles by P.J.Wood. 1945-1958. Yaugher Print: Geelong. (Commentary on historical articles by P.J. Wood).
- 1998 - The Otway Ranges. Yaugher Print: Geelong.
- 2011 - A Guide to the Birds of Geelong : Birds commonly seen in Geelong's suburban gardens, local parks and along the Barwon River Valley. Trevor Pescott: Geelong.
- 2017 - Birds and Botanists : A field naturalist's history of Geelong. Trevor Pescott: Geelong.
