= Ocean Grove Nature Reserve =

Nature reserve near Ocean Grove, Victoria, Australia

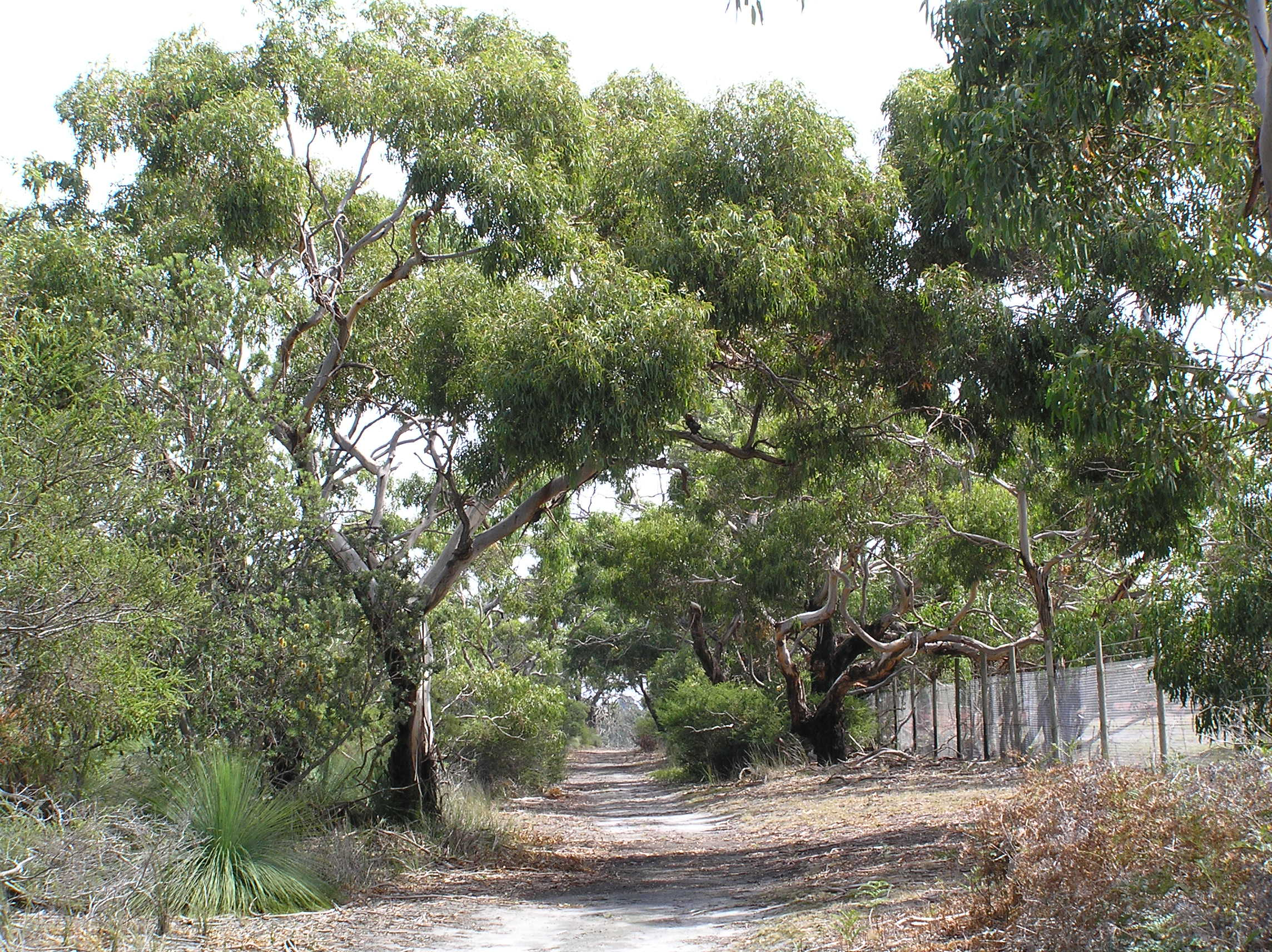
- Reserve walking track

- Location within Victoria
- Location: Victoria
- Nearest city: Ocean Grove
- Coordinates: 38°14′46″S 144°31′45″E
- Area: 1.43 km^{2} (0.55 sq mi)
- Established: 1971
- Governing body: Parks Victoria
- Website: Official website

The Ocean Grove Nature Reserve is a rectangular, 1.43 km^{2} nature reserve next to the town of Ocean Grove and 25 km south-east of the city of Geelong, on the Bellarine Peninsula, Victoria, Australia. It contains the only significant remnant of native woodland on the Bellarine Peninsula as it was prior to European settlement and the extensive land clearing that ensued. It is surrounded by agricultural land and a housing estate and is managed by Parks Victoria. Records of its birdlife illustrate the changes occurring in an isolated woodland remnant.

== History ==
The origins of the reserve go back to the formation of a committee in 1962, at the instigation of the Geelong Field Naturalists Club and its President, Jack Wheeler. The aim was to launch an appeal for funds to acquire an uncleared block of privately owned bushland to protect it from development, with the funds raised enabling the purchase of an initial 81 ha. The reserve was opened to the public in 1971. In 1973 an adjacent 62 ha of partly cleared land, now the eastern section of the reserve, was purchased.

Since the reserve was established, management actions have included the construction of a central wetland and walking tracks, as well as bird hides, an information centre, carpark and picnic ground. The woodland has become denser. There has been damage both from deliberately lit fires and from the construction of breaks for fire control. A period of drought in 2000–2003 killed many eucalypts, following which flowering has been less prolific and large concentrations of honeyeaters have decreased.

== Flora and fauna ==
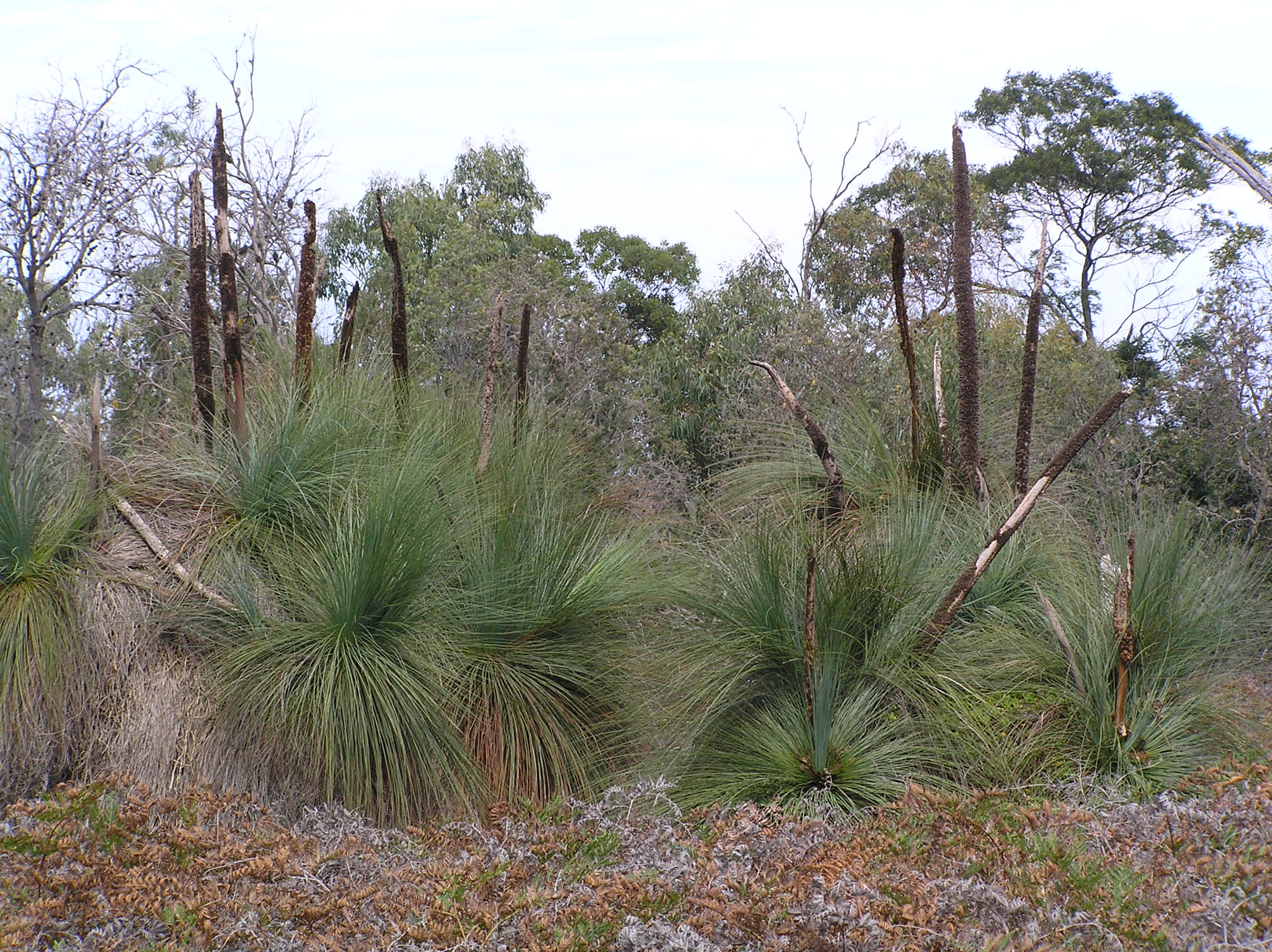
Austral grasstrees in the reserve

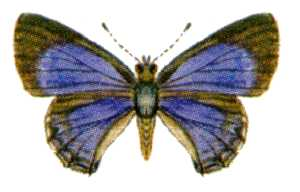
The small ant-blue is now extinct in the reserve

=== Flora ===
Vegetation communities present include areas of eucalypt woodland with Austral grasstrees, coastal manna gums, drooping sheoaks, and the endangered Bellarine form of yellow gum. black sheoaks, black wattles, golden wattles, prickly hedge wattles, coast tea-trees and silver banksias are scattered through the reserve. In a plant list of 178 species, some 22 kinds of orchid have been recorded.

=== Fauna ===
Terrestrial mammals recorded from the reserve include red-necked wallabies, swamp wallabies and short-beaked echidnas. Common ringtail and brushtail possumss, as well as a variety of bats, are active at night. Koalas are sometimes seen. Reptiles present are lowland copperheads and several lizards, including blue-tongued skinks and jacky dragons. A notable invertebrate formerly present was the endangered lycaenid butterfly, the small ant-blue; it is believed to be extinct in the reserve as a result of habitat disturbance.

Marine mammals, cetaceans and pinnipeds, occur off the nearby coastline. Rare southern right whales and endemic Burrunan dolphins, and southern humpback whales and killer whales migrate the area, and Australian sea lions and Australian fur seals may be found resting on beaches.

==== Birds ====
The reserve has been popular with birdwatchers since its inception. An article in the Geelong Bird Report for 2004 analysed records of birds in the reserve from 1970 to 2005. It contains an annotated list of 167 species, with 57 of them confirmed as having bred there. Birds that used to occur in the reserve but have become extinct, not only there but throughout the Bellarine Peninsula, are the bush stone-curlew and grey-crowned babbler. Other birds that have declined or disappeared over the 35-year period studied include white-throated treecreepers, buff-rumped thornbills, scarlet robins, varied sittellas and restless flycatchers, all species of woodland habitats. Birds that have become established in and around the reserve, or increased in numbers over the period, include collared sparrowhawks, little corellas, red-rumped parrots, noisy miners, the introduced spotted doves, European greenfinches and common mynas, as well as, with the construction of the reserve's wetland and other nearby waterpoints, various waterbirds. The authors of the report comment:

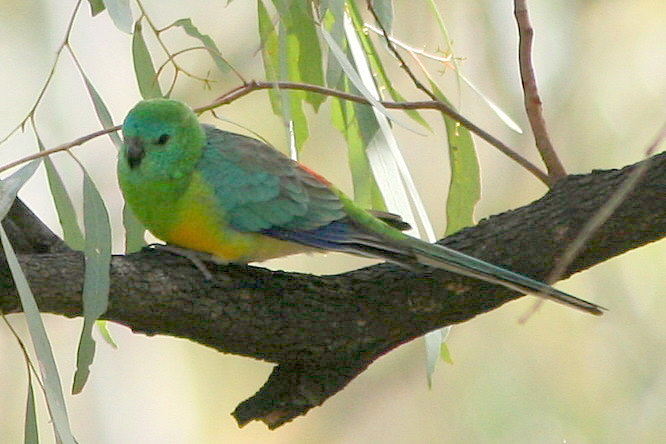
Red-rumped parrots are thriving in the reserve

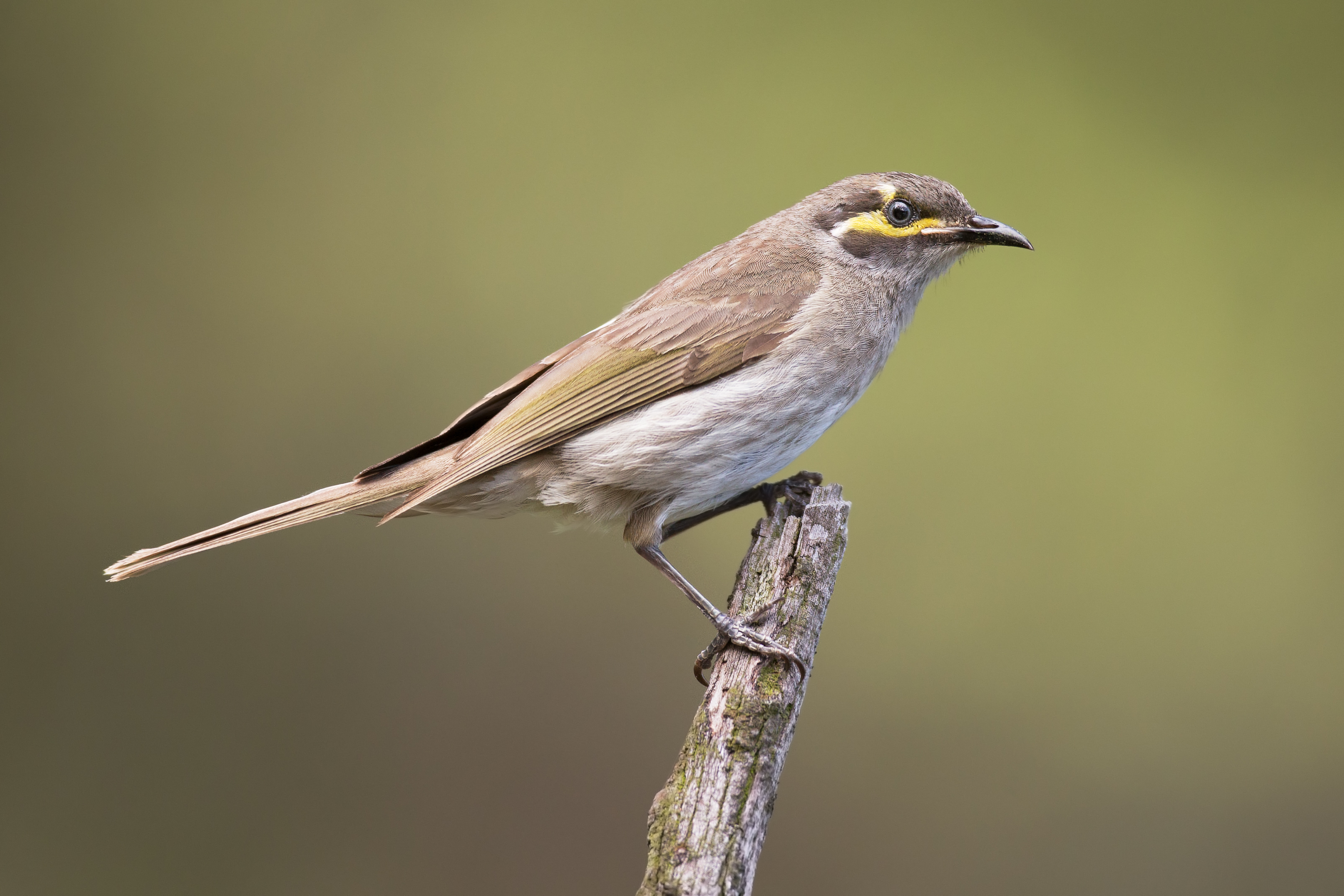
Yellow-faced honeyeaters pass through the reserve

The woodland in the reserve has been isolated for many decades, and yet some bird declines and extinctions have occurred only in the last ten or fifteen years. Bird numbers can clearly fall insidiously, reaching a crisis point many years after the most obvious alterations in the landscape from clearing and settlement. The final crashes may seem abrupt, but their foundations could have been laid long ago. Birds may survive and breed in sub-optimal habitats in the short term, but some populations may eventually become unsustainable, perhaps because of low numbers overall, restrictions on natural movements, or a decrease in breeding success. Birds in woodlands isolated by clearing are particularly susceptible to prolonged dry periods. In very isolated woodland remnants, populations lost to extinction are unlikely to be replenished from outside.

However, the reserve is still important as a stopover in the local and migratory movements of some birds, including the subspecies of striated pardalote, grey fantail and silvereye that breed in Tasmania. Other birds that pass through the reserve, or visit it seasonally, are rufous fantails, flame robins, yellow-faced and white-naped honeyeaters, and mistletoebirds.

The authors of the report conclude:

... as an ‘island’ of original Bellarine Peninsula woodland, the reserve still has great value, not just for birds, but as a living example of a threatened natural community, also encompassing plants, mammals and invertebrates. Since its proclamation, it has always played a valuable role in fostering community awareness and education about the natural environment. It remains a monument to the efforts of its founders and of those volunteers who have continued their work.
