= Papyrius flavus =

Scientific classification
- Kingdom: Animalia
- Phylum: Arthropoda
- Class: Insecta
- Order: Hymenoptera
- Family: Formicidae
- Subfamily: Dolichoderinae
- Genus: Papyrius
- Species: P. flavus

Binomial name
- Papyrius flavus (Mayr, 1865)

Species of ant

Papyrius flavus is a species of ant in the genus Papyrius. Endemic to Australia, it was described by Mayr in 1865.
