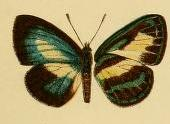

Scientific classification
- Domain: Eukaryota
- Kingdom: Animalia
- Phylum: Arthropoda
- Class: Insecta
- Order: Lepidoptera
- Family: Lycaenidae
- Genus: Hypochrysops
- Species: H. dinawa

Binomial name
- Hypochrysops dinawa (Bethune-Baker, 1908)

Synonyms
- Waigeum dinawa Bethune-Baker, 1908

= Hypochrysops dinawa =

Species of butterfly

Hypochrysops dinawa is a species of butterfly of the family Lycaenidae. It is found from southern New Guinea to Papua New Guinea.Fruhstorfer in Seitz ( page 854 ) provides a description differentiating dinawa from nearby taxa.
