= Eucalyptus leucoxylon subsp. bellarinensis =

Bellarine yellow gum

Scientific classification
- Kingdom: Plantae
- Clade: Tracheophytes
- Clade: Angiosperms
- Clade: Eudicots
- Clade: Rosids
- Order: Myrtales
- Family: Myrtaceae
- Genus: Eucalyptus
- Species: E. leucoxylon
- Subspecies: E. l. subsp. bellarinensis

Trinomial name
- Eucalyptus leucoxylon subsp. bellarinensis Rule

Subspecies of eucalyptus

Eucalyptus leucoxylon subsp. bellarinensis, commonly known as Bellarine yellow gum, is a subspecies of yellow gum that is endemic to the Bellarine Peninsula of southern Victoria, south-eastern Australia.

== Description ==
The Bellarine yellow gum is a small tree, growing up to 12 m in height, with fibrous, grey bark at its base and a smooth upper trunk. It has waxy and opposite juvenile leaves, globular buds which are often prominently beaked, and large, round fruits on stalks that are longer than the fruits. It produces cream-coloured flowers in April and May that provide an important source of nectar for wildlife when little else is flowering. It grows on heavy clay soils that are waterlogged in winter and subject to salt-laden coastal winds.

== Status and conservation ==
Land clearing since European settlement has made this subspecies endangered in Victoria, and it is listed as threatened under the Flora and Fauna Guarantee Act 1988. Once widespread on the peninsula, it now mainly occurs as isolated, scattered trees.
