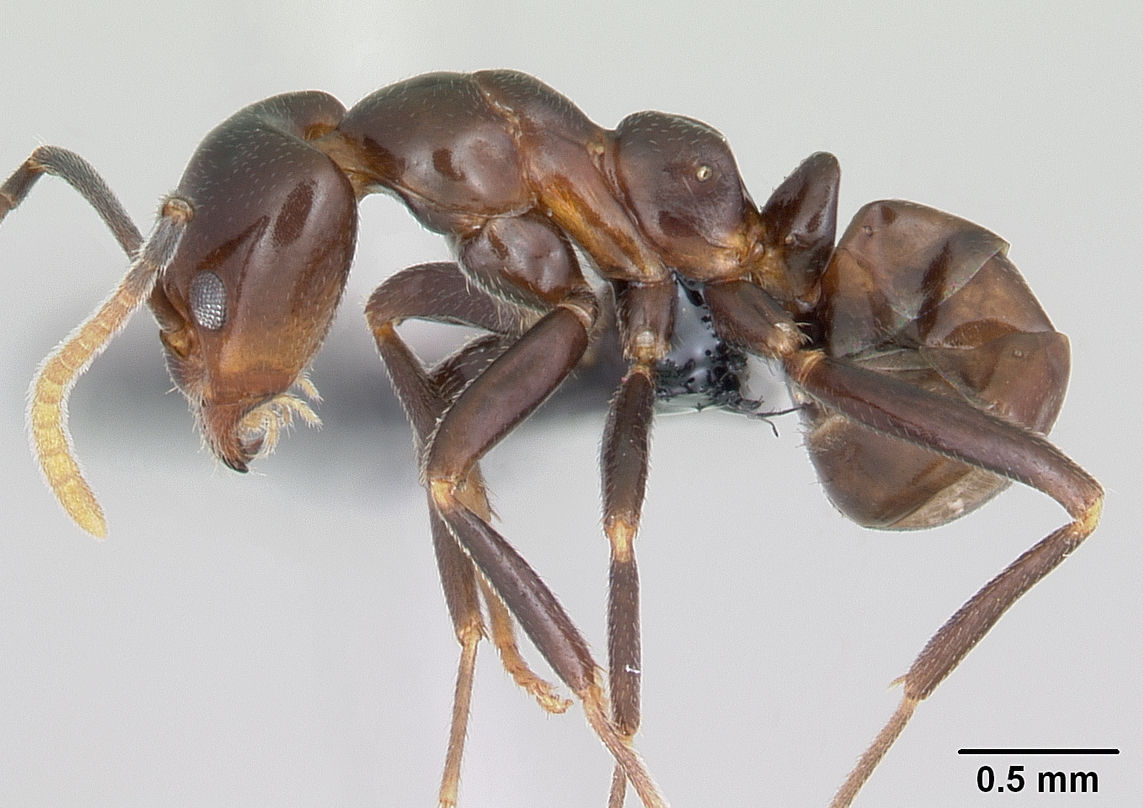
- P. nitidus worker from Australia

Scientific classification
- Kingdom: Animalia
- Phylum: Arthropoda
- Class: Insecta
- Order: Hymenoptera
- Family: Formicidae
- Subfamily: Dolichoderinae
- Tribe: Leptomyrmecini
- Genus: Papyrius; Shattuck, 1992

Type species
- Iridomyrmex nitida

Diversity
- 2 species

= Papyrius (ant) =

Genus of ants

Papyrius is a genus of ants in the subfamily Dolichoderinae. The genus is known only from Australia and New Guinea, where they nest in dead wood in forested areas.

== Species ==
- Papyrius flavus (Mayr, 1865)
- Papyrius nitidus (Mayr, 1862)
