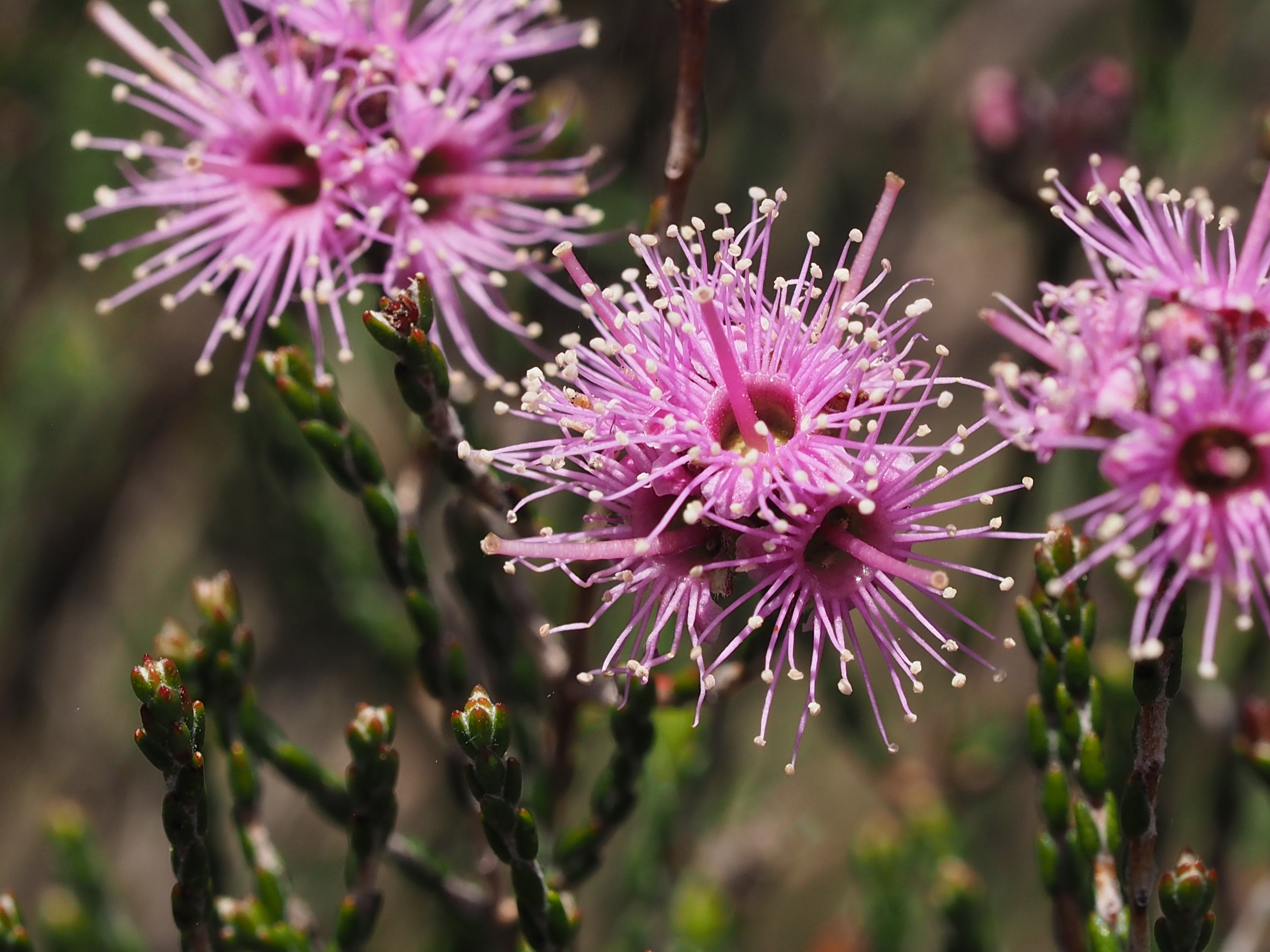
- Kunzea opposita in New England National Park

Scientific classification
- Kingdom: Plantae
- Clade: Tracheophytes
- Clade: Angiosperms
- Clade: Eudicots
- Clade: Rosids
- Order: Myrtales
- Family: Myrtaceae
- Genus: Kunzea
- Species: K. opposita

Binomial name
- Kunzea opposita F.Muell.

= Kunzea opposita =

Species of shrub

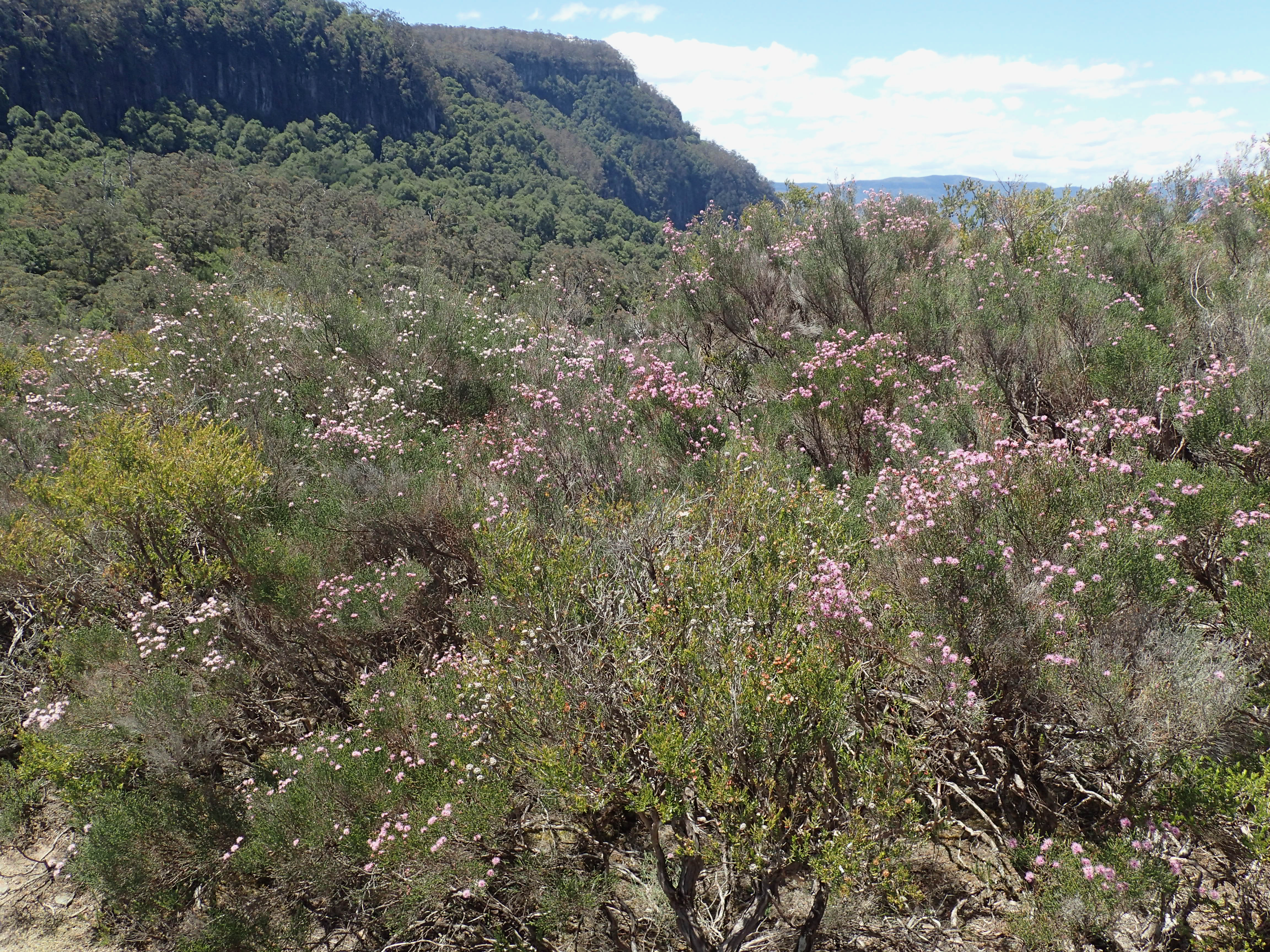
Habit

Kunzea opposita is a plant in the myrtle family, Myrtaceae and is endemic to eastern Australia. It is a spindly shrub which has small leaves arranged in opposite pairs, and pink flowers with five petals and many stamens, the stamens much longer than the petals. It usually grows in woodland or on exposed cliffs.

== Description ==
Kunzea opposita is a spindly shrub which grows to a height of 0.5–3 m (2–10 ft) with its young stems covered with fine hairs. The leaves are mostly arranged in opposite pairs along the branches and are narrow egg-shaped, 1–3 mm (0.04–0.1 in) long and less than 1 mm (0.04 in) wide on a very short petiole. The leaves are glabrous. The flowers are arranged in rounded groups of five to nine on the ends of the branches. There are lance-shaped to egg-shaped bracts which are 2–3 mm (0.08–0.1 in) long and 1–2 mm (0.04–0.08 in) wide, and smaller paired bracteoles at the base the flowers. The floral cup is 3–4 mm (0.1–0.2 in) long and hairy. The sepals are triangular to egg-shaped, 1–1.5 mm (0.04–0.06 in) long and sometimes hairy. The petals are pink, oblong to broadly egg-shaped, about 1.5 mm (0.06 in) long and there are 40 to 50 stamens in several rows. The stamens are 3–5 mm (0.1–0.2 in) long. Flowering occurs in August to November and is followed by fruit which an urn-shaped capsule about 3 mm (0.1 in) long and wide with the sepal lobes attached.

== Taxonomy and naming ==
Kunzea opposita was first formally described in 1867 by Ferdinand von Mueller and the description was published in Fragmenta phytographiae Australiae. The specific epithet (opposita) is a Latin word meaning "on the other side" or "contrary".

== Distribution and habitat ==
This kunzea grows in woodland, forest or exposed cliffs north of the Mount Kaputar National Park in New South Wales and in south-east Queensland.
