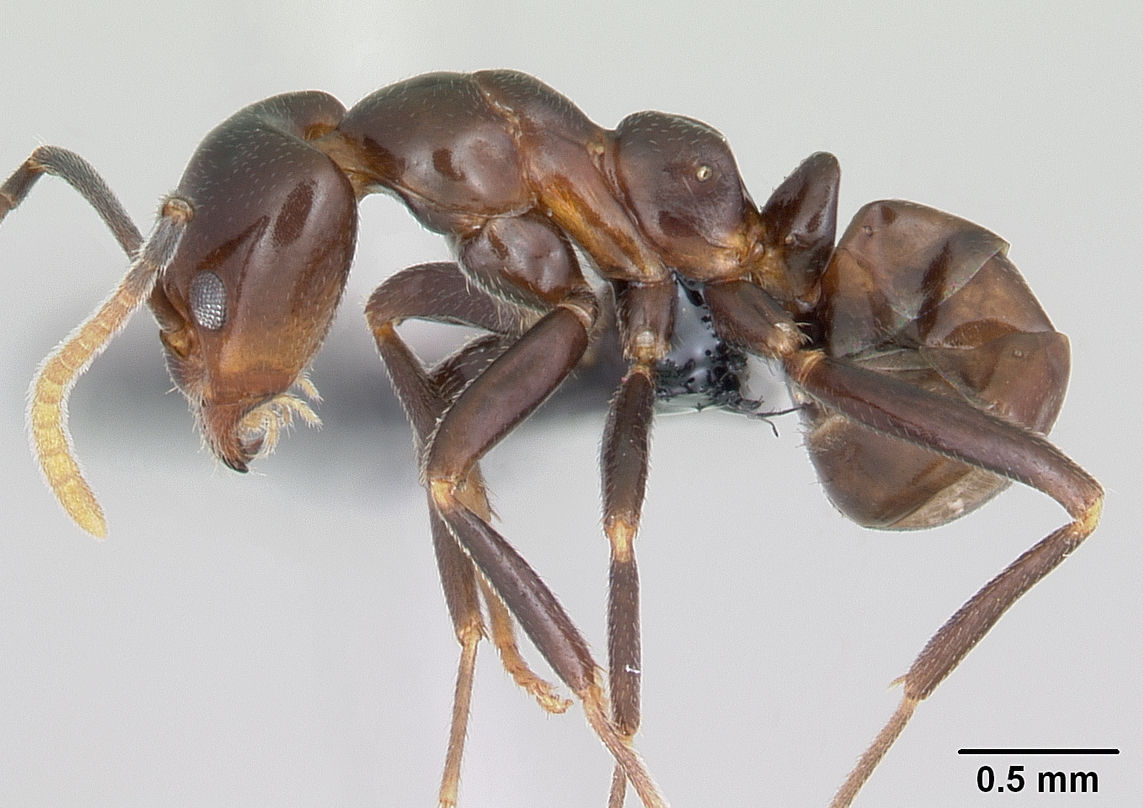

Scientific classification
- Kingdom: Animalia
- Phylum: Arthropoda
- Class: Insecta
- Order: Hymenoptera
- Family: Formicidae
- Subfamily: Dolichoderinae
- Genus: Papyrius
- Species: P. nitidus

Binomial name
- Papyrius nitidus (Mayr, 1862)

Subspecies
- Papyrius nitidus clitellarius Viehmeyer, 1925; Papyrius nitidus oceanicus Forel, 1901; Papyrius nitidus queenslandensis Forel, 1901

Synonyms
- Acantholepis tuberculatus Lowne, 1865

= Papyrius nitidus =

Species of ant

Papyrius nitidus is a species of ant in the genus Papyrius. Endemic to Australia and New Guinea, it was described by Mayr in 1862.
