= List of Litsea species =

Litsea is a widespread genus of plants in the family Lauraceae, native to tropical and subtropical parts of Asia, Australasia, the Pacific, and north and Central America.

== Species ==
The following 399 species are accepted by Plants of the World Online as of February 2026:

== A-B ==
- Litsea aban-gibotii Ng
- Litsea accedens (Blume) Boerl.
- Litsea accedentoides Koord. & Valeton
- Litsea acrantha Ridl.
- Litsea acutivena Hayata
- Litsea aestivalis (L.) Fernald
- Litsea akoensis Hayata
- Litsea alba Kosterm.
- Litsea albayana S.Vidal
- Litsea albescens (Hook.f.) D.G.Long
- Litsea albicans (Kurz) Hook.f.
- Litsea albida (Kosterm.) Kosterm.
- Litsea alleniana A.C.Sm.
- Litsea alveolata C.K.Allen
- Litsea amicorum Kosterm.
- Litsea anamalayana Robi & Udayan
- Litsea anamo Kosterm.
- Litsea andreana Ng
- Litsea aneityensis Guillaumin
- Litsea angulata Blume
- Litsea anomala Merr.
- Litsea areolata (Blume) Boerl.
- Litsea artocarpifolia Gamble
- Litsea assamica Hook.f.
- Litsea aurea Kosterm.
- Litsea auricolor Kosterm.
- Litsea auriculata S.S.Chien & W.C.Cheng
- Litsea australis B.Hyland
- Litsea bainingensis Rech.
- Litsea balansae Lecomte
- Litsea banaensis de Kok
- Litsea barringtonioides Kosterm.
- Litsea baruringensis Elmer
- Litsea baticulin (Blanco) Kosterm.
- Litsea baviensis Lecomte
- Litsea beilschmiediifolia H.W.Li
- Litsea bennettii B.Hyland
- Litsea bernhardensis C.K.Allen
- Litsea beusekomii Kosterm.
- Litsea biflora H.P.Tsui
- Litsea bindoniana (F.Muell.) F.Muell.
- Litsea boerlagei Kosterm.
- Litsea borneensis (Meisn.) Boerl.
- Litsea bourdillonii Gamble
- Litsea brachypoda C.K.Allen
- Litsea brachystachya (Blume) Fern.-Vill.
- Litsea brassii O.C.Schmidt
- Litsea brawas (Blume) Boerl.
- Litsea breviumbellata C.K.Allen
- Litsea brookeana Kosterm.
- Litsea buinensis Kosterm.
- Litsea burckelloides A.C.Sm.

== C-D ==
- Litsea calicaris (Sol. ex A.Cunn.) Benth. & Hook.f. ex Kirk
- Litsea calophylla (Miq.) Mansf.
- Litsea calophyllantha K.Schum.
- Litsea cambodiana Lecomte
- Litsea cangyuanensis J.Li & H.W.Li
- Litsea caroli Teschner
- Litsea carrii Kosterm.
- Litsea castanea Hook.f.
- Litsea catubigensiskos Kosterm.
- Litsea caulocarpa Merr.
- Litsea ceramensis Kosterm.
- Litsea chartacea (Wall. ex Nees) Hook.f.
- Litsea chengshuzhii H.P.Tsui
- Litsea chewii Kosterm.
- Litsea chinpingensis Yen C.Yang & P.H.Huang
- Litsea chrysoneura Kosterm.
- Litsea chrysophoena (Blume) Boerl.
- Litsea chrysopleura (Blume) Boerl.
- Litsea chunii W.C.Cheng
- Litsea cinnamomea Blume
- Litsea citronella Kosterm.
- Litsea clarissae (Teschner) Kosterm.
- Litsea clarkei Prain
- Litsea claviflora Gamble
- Litsea clemensii C.K.Allen
- Litsea coelestis H.P.Tsui
- Litsea collina S.Moore
- Litsea complanata C.K.Allen
- Litsea confusa Koord. & Valeton
- Litsea connorsii B.Hyland
- Litsea cordata (Jack) Hook.f.
- Litsea coreana H.Lév.
- Litsea coriacea (B.Heyne ex Nees) Hook.f.
- Litsea costalis (Nees) Kosterm.
- Litsea crassifolia (Blume) Boerl.
- Litsea crebriflora S.Moore
- Litsea crenata C.K.Allen
- Litsea cubeba (Lour.) Pers.
- Litsea cuprea Merr.
- Litsea curtisii Gamble
- Litsea cuspidata (Blume) Boerl.
- Litsea cuttingiana C.K.Allen
- Litsea densiflora (Teschner) Kosterm.
- Litsea deplanchei Guillaumin
- Litsea depressa H.P.Tsui
- Litsea dielsiana Teschner
- Litsea dilleniifolia P.Y.Pai & P.H.Huang
- Litsea diospyrifolia Quisumb.
- Litsea discocalyx Kosterm.
- Litsea discolor (Blume) Zipp. ex Boerl.
- Litsea diversifolia Blume
- Litsea domarensis O.C.Schmidt
- Litsea dorsalicana M.Q.Han & Y.S.Huang
- Litsea doshia (D.Don) Kosterm.
- Litsea dunniana H.Lév.

== E-G ==
- Litsea elliptica Blume
- Litsea ellipticibacca Merr.
- Litsea elmeri Merr.
- Litsea elmeriana Rasingam & Karthig.
- Litsea elongata (Nees) Hook.f.
- Litsea engleriana Teschner
- Litsea erectinervia Kosterm.
- Litsea eugenioides A.Chev. ex H.Liu
- Litsea exsudens Kosterm.
- Litsea fawcettiana (F.Muell.) B.Hyland
- Litsea fenestrata Gamble
- Litsea ferruginea (Blume) Blume
- Litsea ficoidea Kosterm.
- Litsea filipedunculata Kosterm.
- Litsea flexuosa (Blume) Boerl.
- Litsea floribunda (Blume) Gamble
- Litsea fluminensis Kosterm.
- Litsea fo K.Schum. & Lauterb.
- Litsea formanii Kosterm.
- Litsea forstenii (Blume) Boerl.
- Litsea fosbergii Kosterm.
- Litsea foveola Kosterm.
- Litsea fulva (Blume) Fern.-Vill.
- Litsea fulvosericea C.K.Allen
- Litsea garciae S.Vidal
- Litsea gardneri (Thwaites) Meisn.
- Litsea gemelliflora (Miq.) Boerl.
- Litsea ghatica Saldanha
- Litsea gigaphylla Kosterm.
- Litsea gilgiana Teschner
- Litsea glaberrima (Thwaites) Trimen
- Litsea glabrata (Wall. ex Nees) Hook.f.
- Litsea glabrifolia Ridl.
- Litsea glaucescens Kunth
- Litsea globifera Kosterm.
- Litsea globosa Kosterm.
- Litsea globularia Ng
- Litsea glutinosa (Lour.) C.B.Rob.
- Litsea gongshanensis H.W.Li
- Litsea gorayana Udayan & Robi
- Litsea gracilipes Hook.f.
- Litsea grandifolia Lecomte
- Litsea grandis (Nees) Hook.f.
- Litsea granitica B.Hyland
- Litsea grayana A.C.Sm.
- Litsea greenmaniana C.K.Allen
- Litsea grisea (Blume) Boerl.
- Litsea guppyi (F.Muell.) Forman

== H-L ==
- Litsea habbemensis C.K.Allen
- Litsea hayatae Kaneh.
- Litsea helferi Hook.f.
- Litsea henricksonii Kosterm.
- Litsea himalayensis R.Kr.Singh
- Litsea hirsutissima Gamble
- Litsea hirta (Blume) Boerl.
- Litsea honbaensis de Kok
- Litsea honghoensis H.Liu
- Litsea hookeri (Meisn.) D.G.Long
- Litsea hornei A.C.Sm.
- Litsea humboldtiana Guillaumin
- Litsea hunanensis Yen C.Yang & P.H.Huang
- Litsea hupehana Hemsl.
- Litsea hutchinsonii Merr.
- Litsea hypophaea Hayata
- Litsea ichangensis Gamble
- Litsea ilocana Merr.
- Litsea imbricata Guillaumin
- Litsea impressa (Blume) Boerl.
- Litsea imthurnii Turrill
- Litsea indoverticillata Robi & Udayan
- Litsea insignis (Blume) Boerl.
- Litsea intermedia (Blume) Boerl.
- Litsea irianensis Kosterm.
- Litsea japonica (Thunb.) Juss.
- Litsea jaswirii Ng
- Litsea johorensis Gamble
- Litsea kakkachensis R.Ganesan
- Litsea kauloensis Teschner
- Litsea keralana Kosterm.
- Litsea kerrii Kosterm.
- Litsea kingii Hook.f.
- Litsea kobuskiana C.K.Allen
- Litsea kurzii King ex Hook.f.
- Litsea kwangsiensis Yen C.Yang & P.H.Huang
- Litsea kwangtungensis H.T.Chang
- Litsea laeta (Nees) Trimen
- Litsea laevigata (Nees) Gamble
- Litsea lanceolata (Blume) Kosterm.
- Litsea lancifolia (Roxb. ex Nees) Fern.-Vill.
- Litsea lancilimba Merr.
- Litsea lecardii Guillaumin
- Litsea ledermannii Teschner
- Litsea leefeana (F.Muell.) Merr.
- Litsea leiantha (Kurz) Hook.f.
- Litsea leytensis Merr.
- Litsea liboshengii H.P.Tsui
- Litsea ligustrina (Nees) Fern.-Vill.
- Litsea lithocarpoides Kosterm.
- Litsea litseifolia (C.K.Allen) Yen C.Yang & P.H.Huang
- Litsea longepedunculata Kosterm.
- Litsea longipedicellata Kosterm.
- Litsea longipes (Meisn.) Hook.f.
- Litsea luzonica (Blume) Fern.-Vill.

== M-N ==
- Litsea machilifolia Gamble
- Litsea machiloides Yen C.Yang & P.H.Huang
- Litsea mafuluensis C.K.Allen
- Litsea magnifolia Gillespie
- Litsea maingayi Hook.f.
- Litsea maluensis Teschner
- Litsea manilaliana Robi & Udayan
- Litsea martabanica (Kurz) Hook.f.
- Litsea mathuataensis A.C.Sm.
- Litsea megalophylla Merr.
- Litsea megamalayana Karupp., V.Ravich. & Bharath
- Litsea meghalayensis R.Kr.Singh
- Litsea mekongensis Lecomte
- Litsea melchioriana (Teschner) Kosterm.
- Litsea mellifera A.C.Sm.
- Litsea membranifolia Hook.f.
- Litsea meyeri Kosterm.
- Litsea miana Guillaumin
- Litsea micrantha Merr.
- Litsea minor Teschner
- Litsea miqueliana (Kuntze) ined.
- Litsea mishmiensis Hook.f.
- Litsea mollis Hemsl.
- Litsea monopetala (Roxb.) Pers.
- Litsea montis-dulit Airy Shaw
- Litsea morobensis C.K.Allen
- Litsea morotaiensis Kosterm.
- Litsea morrisonensis Hayata
- Litsea moupinensis Lecomte
- Litsea muellerorum I.M.Turner
- Litsea myristicifolia (Wall. ex Nees) Hook.f.
- Litsea mysorensis Gamble
- Litsea nemoralis (Thwaites) Trimen
- Litsea neocaledonica S.Moore
- Litsea neohebridensis Kosterm.
- Litsea nervosa (Meisn.) Grierson & D.G.Long
- Litsea nhatrangensis de Kok
- Litsea nicobarica Bhuinya & P.Singh
- Litsea nigrescens Gamble
- Litsea nigricans (Meisn.) Boerl.
- Litsea nitida (Roxb. ex Nees) Hook.f.
- Litsea noronhae Blume
- Litsea novoguinensis Teschner
- Litsea novoleontis Bartlett
- Litsea nuculanea (Kurz) Hook.f.

== O-R ==
- Litsea oblongifolia Merr.
- Litsea obscura (Blume) Boerl.
- Litsea oleoides (Meisn.) Hook.f.
- Litsea oligophlebia H.T.Chang
- Litsea oppositifolia Gibbs
- Litsea orocola Kosterm.
- Litsea ovalifolia (Wight) Trimen
- Litsea ovalis Kosterm.
- Litsea pallens Lundell
- Litsea pallida (Blume) Boerl.
- Litsea pallidifolia Merr.
- Litsea palmatinervia (Meisn.) Benth. & Hook.f. ex Drake
- Litsea palustris Kosterm.
- Litsea panamanja (Buch.-Ham. ex Nees) Hook.f.
- Litsea papillosa C.K.Allen
- Litsea papuana K.Schum.
- Litsea parvifolia (Hemsl.) Mez
- Litsea pedicellata Bartlett
- Litsea pedunculata (Diels) Yen C.Yang & P.H.Huang
- Litsea penangiana Hook.f.
- Litsea pentaflora Guillaumin
- Litsea pentagona Merr.
- Litsea perfulva Elmer
- Litsea perglabra C.K.Allen
- Litsea perlucida C.K.Allen
- Litsea perrottetii (Blume) Fern.-Vill.
- Litsea philippinensis Merr.
- Litsea phuwuaensis Ngerns.
- Litsea pickeringii (A.Gray ex Seem.) Benth. & Hook.f. ex Drake
- Litsea pittosporifolia Yen C.Yang & P.H.Huang
- Litsea plateifolia Elmer
- Litsea polyneura (Meisn.) Boerl.
- Litsea populifolia Gamble
- Litsea pringlei Bartlett
- Litsea prolixa S.Moore
- Litsea propinqua (Blume) Boerl.
- Litsea pruriens Kosterm.
- Litsea pseudoelongata H.Liu
- Litsea pseudoumbellata Kosterm.
- Litsea psilophylla Kosterm.
- Litsea pumila Kosterm.
- Litsea punctata (Blume) Boerl.
- Litsea punctulata Kosterm.
- Litsea pungens Hemsl.
- Litsea quadrangularis Kosterm.
- Litsea quercoides Elmer
- Litsea racemosa C.T.White
- Litsea rangoonensis (Meisn.) Hook.f.
- Litsea resinosa Blume
- Litsea reticulata (Meisn.) Benth. & Hook.f. ex F.Muell.
- Litsea richii A.C.Sm.
- Litsea ridleyi Gamble
- Litsea rigidifrons Kosterm.
- Litsea riparia (Blume) Boerl.
- Litsea ripidion Guillaumin
- Litsea robusta Blume
- Litsea rotundata (Blume) Kosterm.
- Litsea rotundifolia (Nees) Hemsl.
- Litsea rubescens Lecomte
- Litsea rubicunda Kosterm.
- Litsea rubiginosa (Blume) Boerl.
- Litsea rubra Blume
- Litsea rubrobrunnea de Kok

== S-T ==
- Litsea salicifolia (Roxb. ex Nees) Hook.f.
- Litsea saligna (Nees) N.P.Balakr.
- Litsea salmonea A.Chev. ex Dao
- Litsea samoensis (Christoph.) A.C.Sm.
- Litsea sandakanensis Merr.
- Litsea santapaui Kosterm.
- Litsea schlechteri Teschner
- Litsea seemannii (Meisn.) Benth. & Hook.f. ex Drake
- Litsea segregata Elmer
- Litsea semecarpifolia (Wall. ex Nees) Hook.f.
- Litsea sepikensis Kosterm.
- Litsea sericea (Wall. ex Nees) Hook.f.
- Litsea sessiliflora Hook.f.
- Litsea sessilifructa (C.J.Qi & K.W.Liu) L.Wu & J.J.Zhou
- Litsea sessilis Boerl.
- Litsea siamensis van der Werff
- Litsea sinoglobosa J.Li & H.W.Li
- Litsea solomonensis C.K.Allen
- Litsea spathulata Kosterm.
- Litsea spathuliformis Munzinger & McPherson
- Litsea sphaerocarpa Blume
- Litsea staintonii Kosterm.
- Litsea steenisii Kosterm.
- Litsea stenophylla Guillaumin
- Litsea stickmanii Merr.
- Litsea stocksii (Meisn.) Hook.f.
- Litsea subauriculata Kosterm.
- Litsea subcoriacea Yen C.Yang & P.H.Huang
- Litsea suberosa Yen C.Yang & P.H.Huang
- Litsea suboppositifolia Ng
- Litsea subovata (Miq.) Kosterm.
- Litsea subumbelliflora (Blume) Ng
- Litsea sulavesiana Kosterm.
- Litsea sumatrana (Miq.) Boerl.
- Litsea szemaois (H.Liu) J.Li & H.W.Li
- Litsea taiwanensis S.S.Ying
- Litsea talaumifolia Kosterm.
- Litsea tannaensis Guillaumin
- Litsea taronensis H.W.Li
- Litsea tenuipes Ridl.
- Litsea tetranthera Mirb.
- Litsea tharpiana Standl.
- Litsea thorelii Lecomte
- Litsea tibetana Yen C.Yang & P.H.Huang
- Litsea timonioides Kosterm.
- Litsea tomentosa Blume
- Litsea travancorica Gamble
- Litsea trichophylla Kosterm.
- Litsea triflora Guillaumin
- Litsea tsinlingensis Yen C.Yang & P.H.Huang
- Litsea tuberculata (Blume) Boerl.
- Litsea turfosa Kosterm.

== U-Z ==
- Litsea udayanii Robi
- Litsea umbellata (Lour.) Merr.
- Litsea uniflora Guillaumin
- Litsea unita (Blume) Boerl.
- Litsea urdanetensis Elmer
- Litsea utilis (Meisn.) Boerl.
- Litsea vagamonica Robi & Vijayash.
- Litsea vang Lecomte
- Litsea vanoverberghii Merr.
- Litsea variabilis Hemsl.
- Litsea varians (Blume) Boerl.
- Litsea veitchiana Gamble
- Litsea velutina (Blume) Boerl.
- Litsea venulosa (Meisn.) Hook.f.
- Litsea versteeghii C.K.Allen
- Litsea verticillata Hance
- Litsea verticillifolia Yen C.Yang & P.H.Huang
- Litsea virens (Nees) Boerl.
- Litsea viridis H.Liu
- Litsea vitiana (Meisn.) Benth. & Hook.f. ex Drake
- Litsea walkeri Trimen
- Litsea whiteana C.K.Allen
- Litsea whitfordii Merr.
- Litsea wightiana (Nees) Wall. ex Hook.f.
- Litsea wilsonii Gamble
- Litsea xanthophylla (Blume) Boerl.
- Litsea xiangliaoshu Z.Y.Zhu
- Litsea yaoshanensis Yen C.Yang & P.H.Huang
- Litsea yunnanensis Yen C.Yang & P.H.Huang
