= Bollywood (tree) =

Bollywood may refer to a number of tree species:

- Cinnamomum baileyanum, brown Bollywood
- Lindera queenslandica, Bollywood
- Litsea bindoniana, big-leaf Bollywood, round-leaf Bollywood
- Litsea breviumbellata, brown Bollywood, rusty-leaf Bollywood
- Litsea connorsii, Bollywood
- Litsea fawcettiana, brown Bollywood
- Litsea glutinosa, brown Bollywood
- Litsea granitica, Bollywood
- Litsea leefeana, brown Bollywood, big-leaf Bollywood
- Litsea reticulata, brown Bollywood
- Neolitsea brassii, grey Bollywood
- Neolitsea cassia, grey Bollywood
- Neolitsea dealbata, grey Bollywood, velvet-leaf Bollywood, white Bollywood

== See also ==
- Bollygum
