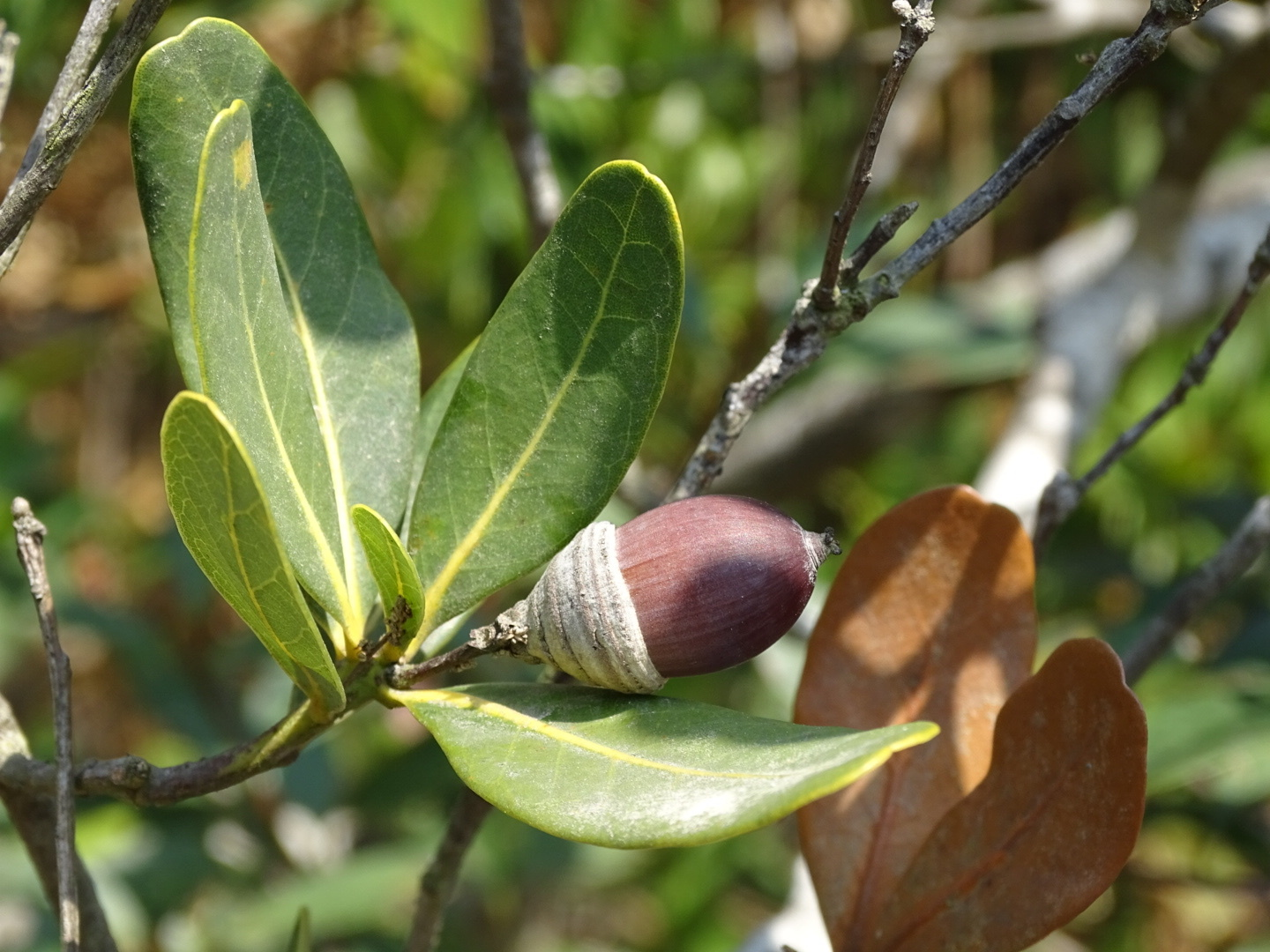

Conservation status
- Vulnerable (IUCN 3.1)

Scientific classification
- Kingdom: Plantae
- Clade: Embryophytes
- Clade: Tracheophytes
- Clade: Spermatophytes
- Clade: Angiosperms
- Clade: Eudicots
- Clade: Rosids
- Order: Fagales
- Family: Fagaceae
- Genus: Quercus
- Subgenus: Quercus subg. Cerris
- Section: Quercus sect. Cyclobalanopsis
- Species: Q. litseoides

Binomial name
- Quercus litseoides Dunn 1909

Synonyms
- Cyclobalanopsis litseoides (Dunn) Schottky

= Quercus litseoides =

Species of tree

Quercus litseoides is an uncommon Asian species of trees in the beech family Fagaceae. It has been found only in southern China, in the Provinces of Guangdong and Guangxi. It is placed in subgenus Cerris, section Cyclobalanopsis.

Quercus litseoides is a tree up to 10 meters tall. Leaves can be as much as 7 cm long.

The epithet "litseoides" refers to a resemblance between this tree and Litsea chinensis, now called Litsea glutinosa.
