= Litsea scortechinii =

Conservation status
- Critically Endangered (IUCN 2.3)

Scientific classification
- Kingdom: Plantae
- Clade: Tracheophytes
- Clade: Angiosperms
- Clade: Magnoliids
- Order: Laurales
- Family: Lauraceae
- Genus: Litsea
- Species: L. scortechinii

Binomial name
- Litsea scortechinii Gamble

Species of tree

Litsea scortechinii is a species of plant in the family Lauraceae. It is a tree endemic to Peninsular Malaysia. It is threatened by habitat loss.
