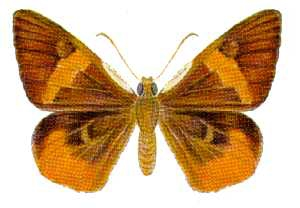
- C. c. sphinterifera

Scientific classification
- Kingdom: Animalia
- Phylum: Arthropoda
- Clade: Pancrustacea
- Class: Insecta
- Order: Lepidoptera
- Family: Hesperiidae
- Genus: Chaetocneme
- Species: C. critomedia

Binomial name
- Chaetocneme critomedia (Guérin-Méneville, [1831])

Synonyms
- Hesperia critomedia Guérin-Méneville, 1831; Casyapa sphinterifera Fruhstorfer, 1910

= Chaetocneme critomedia =

Species of butterfly

Chaetocneme critomedia, the banded red-eye or banded dusk-flat, is a species of butterfly of the family Hesperiidae. It is found in Indonesia (Irian Jaya, Maluku), New Guinea and Australia.

The wingspan is about 50 mm.

The larvae feed on various plants, including Blephocarya involucrigera, Annona reticulata, Mallotus polyadenos, Neolitsea dealbata, Syzygium bamagense and Commersonia bartramia.

== Subspecies ==
- Chaetocneme critomedia critomedia (Indonesia)
- Chaetocneme critomedia sphinterifera (Cape York, Australia)
