= Litsea maingayi =

Conservation status
- Least Concern (IUCN 3.1)

Scientific classification
- Kingdom: Plantae
- Clade: Tracheophytes
- Clade: Angiosperms
- Clade: Magnoliids
- Order: Laurales
- Family: Lauraceae
- Genus: Litsea
- Species: L. maingayi

Binomial name
- Litsea maingayi Hook.f.

Synonyms
- Litsea foxiana Gamble; Malapoenna maingayi (Hook.f.) Kuntze

Species of tree

Litsea foxiana is a species of flowering plant in the family Lauraceae. It is a tree native to Peninsular Malaysia and Sumatra.
