= Caloptilia oenopella =

Scientific classification
- Kingdom: Animalia
- Phylum: Arthropoda
- Clade: Pancrustacea
- Class: Insecta
- Order: Lepidoptera
- Family: Gracillariidae
- Genus: Caloptilia
- Species: C. oenopella

Binomial name
- Caloptilia oenopella (Meyrick, 1880)

Synonyms
- Gracilaria oenopella Meyrick, 1880; Gracilaria albicincta Turner, 1900

Species of moth

Caloptilia oenopella is a moth of the family Gracillariidae. It is known from New South Wales and Queensland, Australia.

The larvae feed on Litsea leefeana (synonym: Tetranthera ferruginea).
