= Litsea bennettii =

- Botanical illustration

Conservation status
- Least Concern (IUCN 3.1)

Scientific classification
- Kingdom: Plantae
- Clade: Tracheophytes
- Clade: Angiosperms
- Clade: Magnoliids
- Order: Laurales
- Family: Lauraceae
- Genus: Litsea
- Species: L. bennettii

Binomial name
- Litsea bennettii B.Hyland

Species of flowering plant

Litsea bennettii is a species of plant in the family Lauraceae native to northeast Queensland, Australia. It is a rainforest tree, first described in 1989. It has a conservation status of least concern.

== Description ==
Litsea bennettii is a tree that may grow to about 25 m (82 ft) in height and 50 cm (20 in) diameter. The trunk may be buttressed in older specimens. The leaves are green above and the underside is covered in fine brown hairs. They are generally about 6 cm (2.4 in) long and 3 cm (1.2 in) wide, the midrib is depressed in the upper surface and there are between four and six pairs of lateral veins branching from it.

The inflorescence is an umbel which emerges from the leaf axils or from the twigs below the leaves. Flowers are green to cream and are scented. They have four to six tepals in a single whorl, each about 2 mm (0.08 in) long. The fruit is an ellipsoid drupe, reddish when immature and ripening to black. They measure up to 1.8 cm (0.7 in) long and 1.4 cm (0.6 in) wide and contain a single brown seed about 1.2 cm (0.5 in) long.

== Distribution ==
It is restricted to mountain areas above 1,100 m (3,600 ft), where it grows in rainforest on granite based soils. It ranges from Mount Finnegan, near Cooktown, to Hinchinbrook Island.

== Taxonomy ==
The species was first described in 1989 by Australian botanist Bernard Hyland, in his 367-page revision of the Lauraceae family in Australia. The description was based on material he collected himself from Mount Bellenden Ker in 1983.

=== Etymology ===
The species epithet 'bennettii' is in honour of Graham Bennett, who was at the time in charge of the cableway that ascends Mount Bellenden Ker.

== Conservation ==
This species was assessed by the International Union for Conservation of Nature (IUCN) in 2025 and found to be of least concern. It has been given the same rating by the Queensland Government in its Wildnet database under the Nature Conservation Act. In its statement, the IUCN cites the species' extent of occurrence of almost 10,000 km^{2} (3,900 sq mi), all within protected areas, and the lack of any major threats having been identified as the basis for the assessment. The Wildnet database does not provide any explanations for its assessments.
