= Litsea accedens =

Conservation status
- Least Concern (IUCN 3.1)

Scientific classification
- Kingdom: Plantae
- Clade: Tracheophytes
- Clade: Angiosperms
- Clade: Magnoliids
- Order: Laurales
- Family: Lauraceae
- Genus: Litsea
- Species: L. accedens

Binomial name
- Litsea accedens (Blume) Boerl.

Varieties
- Litsea accedens var. accedens; Litsea accedens var. kinabaluensis (Kosterm.) Ng

Synonyms
- Cylicodaphne accedens (Blume) Meisn.; Tetranthera accedens Blume; synonyms of var. accedens: Cylicodaphne costata Blume; Cylicodaphne ochracea Blume; Lepidadenia ochracea Miq.; Litsea accedens var. oblanceolata (Gamble) Ng; Litsea costata (Blume) Boerl.; Litsea kunstleri Gamble; Litsea oblanceolata Gamble; Litsea ochracea (Blume) Boerl.; Litsea ochracea var. oblanceolata (Gamble) Kochummen ex I.M.Turner; Litsea patellaris Gamble; Litsea perakensis Gamble; Litsea pustulata Gamble; Litsea singaporensis Gamble; Litsea wrayi Gamble; Malapoenna accedens Kuntze; synonyms of var. kinabaluensis: Litsea kinabaluensis Kosterm.

Species of tree

Litsea accedens is a species of flowering plant in the family Lauraceae. It is a tree native to Peninsular Malaysia, Peninsular Thailand, Borneo, Sumatra, and the Nicobar Islands.

Two varieties are accepted:

- Litsea accedens var. accedens
- Litsea accedens var. kinabaluensis (Kosterm.) Ng – endemic to northern Borneo

The species was first described as Tetranthera accedens by Carl Ludwig Blume in 1851. In 1900 Jacob Gijsbert Boerlage placed the species in genus Litsea as L. accedens.
