= Litsea nigrescens =

Conservation status
- Vulnerable (IUCN 3.1)

Scientific classification
- Kingdom: Plantae
- Clade: Tracheophytes
- Clade: Angiosperms
- Clade: Magnoliids
- Order: Laurales
- Family: Lauraceae
- Genus: Litsea
- Species: L. nigrescens

Binomial name
- Litsea nigrescens Gamble

Species of flowering plant

Litsea nigrescens is a species of plant in the family Lauraceae. It is endemic to India.
