= Litsea imbricata =

Conservation status
- Endangered (IUCN 2.3)

Scientific classification
- Kingdom: Plantae
- Clade: Tracheophytes
- Clade: Angiosperms
- Clade: Magnoliids
- Order: Laurales
- Family: Lauraceae
- Genus: Litsea
- Species: L. imbricata

Binomial name
- Litsea imbricata Guillaumin

Species of flowering plant

Litsea imbricata is a species of plant in the family Lauraceae. It is endemic to New Caledonia. It is threatened by habitat loss.
