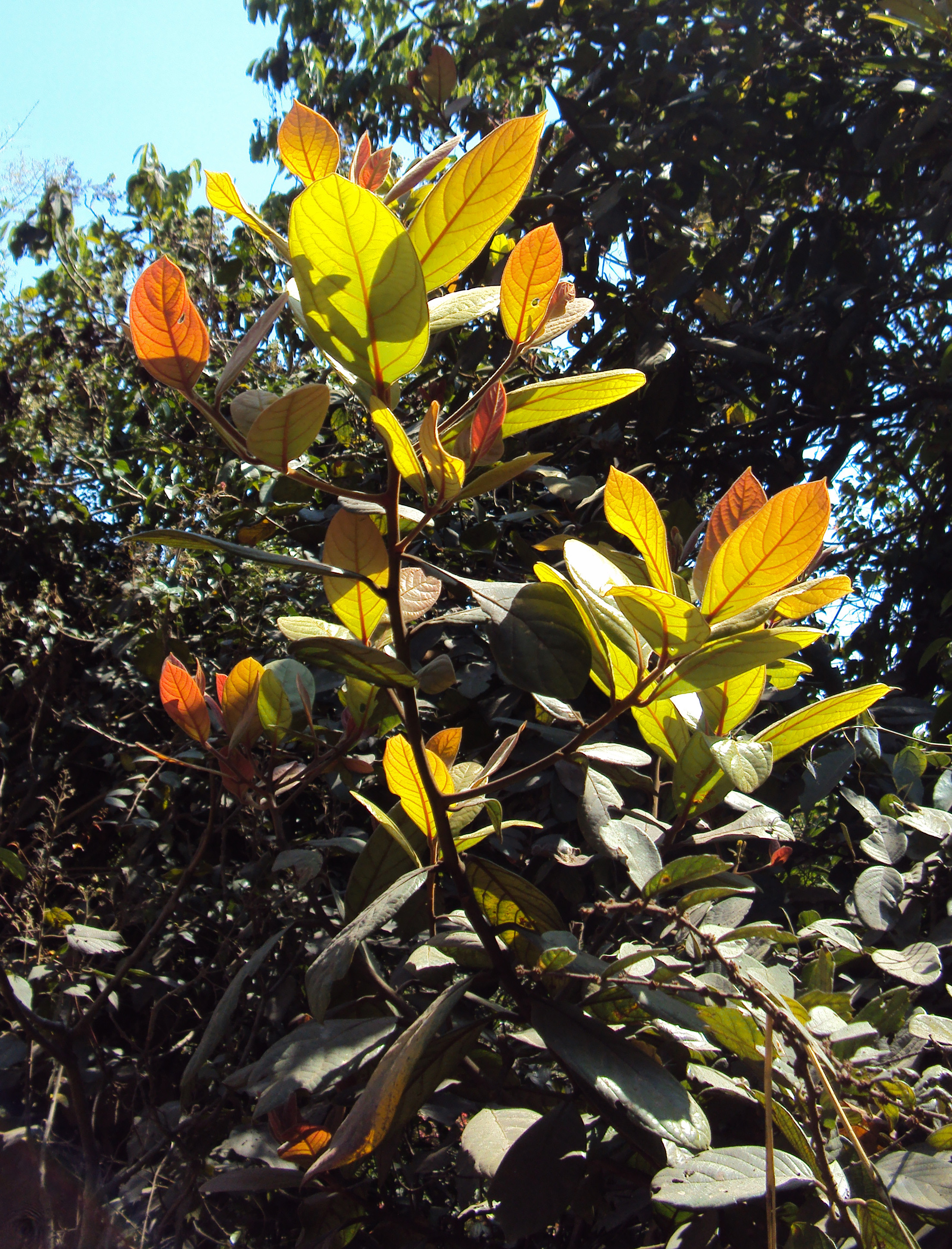

Conservation status
- Near Threatened (IUCN 3.1)

Scientific classification
- Kingdom: Plantae
- Clade: Tracheophytes
- Clade: Angiosperms
- Clade: Magnoliids
- Order: Laurales
- Family: Lauraceae
- Genus: Litsea
- Species: L. wightiana

Binomial name
- Litsea wightiana (Nees) Wall. ex Hook.f.

Synonyms
- Cylicodaphne wightiana Nees (1831); Cylicodaphne wightiana var. glabrescens Meisn. (1864); Malapoenna wightiana (Nees) Kuntze (1891); Tetranthera wightiana Wall. (1830), nom. nud.; Tetranthera wightii Nees (1836)

= Litsea wightiana =

Species of tree

Litsea wightiana is a species of plant in the family Lauraceae. It is a tree which grows 10 to 20 metres tall. It is endemic to Western Ghats of India, in the states of Tamil Nadu, Maharashtra, Kerala, and Karnataka. It grows in evergreen and semi-evergreen montane forests from 1,000 to 2,400 metres elevation.
