= Litsea claviflora =

Conservation status
- Endangered (IUCN 3.1)

Scientific classification
- Kingdom: Plantae
- Clade: Tracheophytes
- Clade: Angiosperms
- Clade: Magnoliids
- Order: Laurales
- Family: Lauraceae
- Genus: Litsea
- Species: L. claviflora

Binomial name
- Litsea claviflora Gamble

Species of tree

Litsea claviflora is a species of plant in the family Lauraceae. It is a tree endemic to Peninsular Malaysia. First discovered and recorded by Gamble in 1910.

== Description ==
L. clavifora can reach up to 9 to 15 m (30 to 49 ft) tall, with a diameter at breast height (dbh) of 10 to 15 cm (3.9 to 5.9 in). Its leaves are elliptic to lanceolate, 8.6–13 × 3.3–5.2 cm. Its inflorescence resembles a raceme of umbels, and can be 11 to 20 cm (4.3 to 7.9 in) long. Male flowers are glabrous inside and hair outside. They appear 6–7 in each umbel, with 6 oblong perianth lobes, 1.8–2.4 × 0.8–1 mm each.
