= Litsea penangiana =

Conservation status
- Vulnerable (IUCN 3.1)

Scientific classification
- Kingdom: Plantae
- Clade: Tracheophytes
- Clade: Angiosperms
- Clade: Magnoliids
- Order: Laurales
- Family: Lauraceae
- Genus: Litsea
- Species: L. penangiana

Binomial name
- Litsea penangiana Hook.f.

Species of tree

Litsea penangiana is a species of plant in the family Lauraceae. It is a tree endemic to Peninsular Malaysia.
