= Litsea saligna =

Conservation status
- Vulnerable (IUCN 3.1)

Scientific classification
- Kingdom: Plantae
- Clade: Tracheophytes
- Clade: Angiosperms
- Clade: Magnoliids
- Order: Laurales
- Family: Lauraceae
- Genus: Litsea
- Species: L. saligna

Binomial name
- Litsea saligna (Nees) N.P.Balakr.

Synonyms
- Cylicodaphne thwaitesii Meisn.; Cylicodaphne thwaitesii var. angustata Meisn.; Litsea angustifolia Hook.f.; Litsea iteodaphne (Nees) Hook.f.; Malapoenna iteodaphne (Nees) Kuntze; Tetranthera angustifolia Wall.; Tetranthera iteodaphne Nees; Tetranthera saligna Nees

Species of flowering plant

Litsea saligna is a species of flowering plant in the family Lauraceae. It is a tree native to northeastern India, Bangladesh, and Sri Lanka.

The species was first described as Tetranthera saligna by Christian Gottfried Daniel Nees von Esenbeck in 1831. In 1967 N. P. Balakrishnan placed the species in genus Litsea as L. saligna.
