= Litsea kakkachensis =

Conservation status
- Endangered (IUCN 3.1)

Scientific classification
- Kingdom: Plantae
- Clade: Tracheophytes
- Clade: Angiosperms
- Clade: Magnoliids
- Order: Laurales
- Family: Lauraceae
- Genus: Litsea
- Species: L. kakkachensis

Binomial name
- Litsea kakkachensis R.Ganesan

Species of plant

Litsea kakkachensis is an endangered species of plant endemic to India.

== Etymology ==
This species was named after Kakkachi forest, part of the Kalakkad Mundanthurai Tiger Reserve in Tamil Nadu, where it was discovered and described. It was initially collected by R.H.Beddome and deposited in the Natural History Museum, London in 1887 with location details and remained unidentified.

== Description ==
This plant grows as shrubs or small trees growing up to 3 meters high. The bark of older trees is papery and reddish brown. The leaves are alternate with bluish color underneath when fresh turning into brown after drying. The red colored fleshy ellipsoid shaped fruits were seen dispersed by birds.

== Ecology ==
This species of plants were found only in et evergreen forests of Courtallum and Kakkachi areas of Kalakkad Mundanthurai Tiger Reserve at an elevation of 900 to 1200 metres. Unlike other Lisea species around that area this plant flower twice an year- April-May and September-October.

== Threats and conservation ==
Deforestation and habitat loss due to land conversions were identified as threats for this species.
