= Litsea dilleniifolia =

Conservation status
- Vulnerable (IUCN 3.1)

Scientific classification
- Kingdom: Plantae
- Clade: Tracheophytes
- Clade: Angiosperms
- Clade: Magnoliids
- Order: Laurales
- Family: Lauraceae
- Genus: Litsea
- Species: L. dilleniifolia

Binomial name
- Litsea dilleniifolia P.Y. Pai & P.H. Huang

Species of flowering plant

Litsea dilleniifolia is a species of plant in the family Lauraceae. It is endemic to China. It is threatened by habitat loss.
