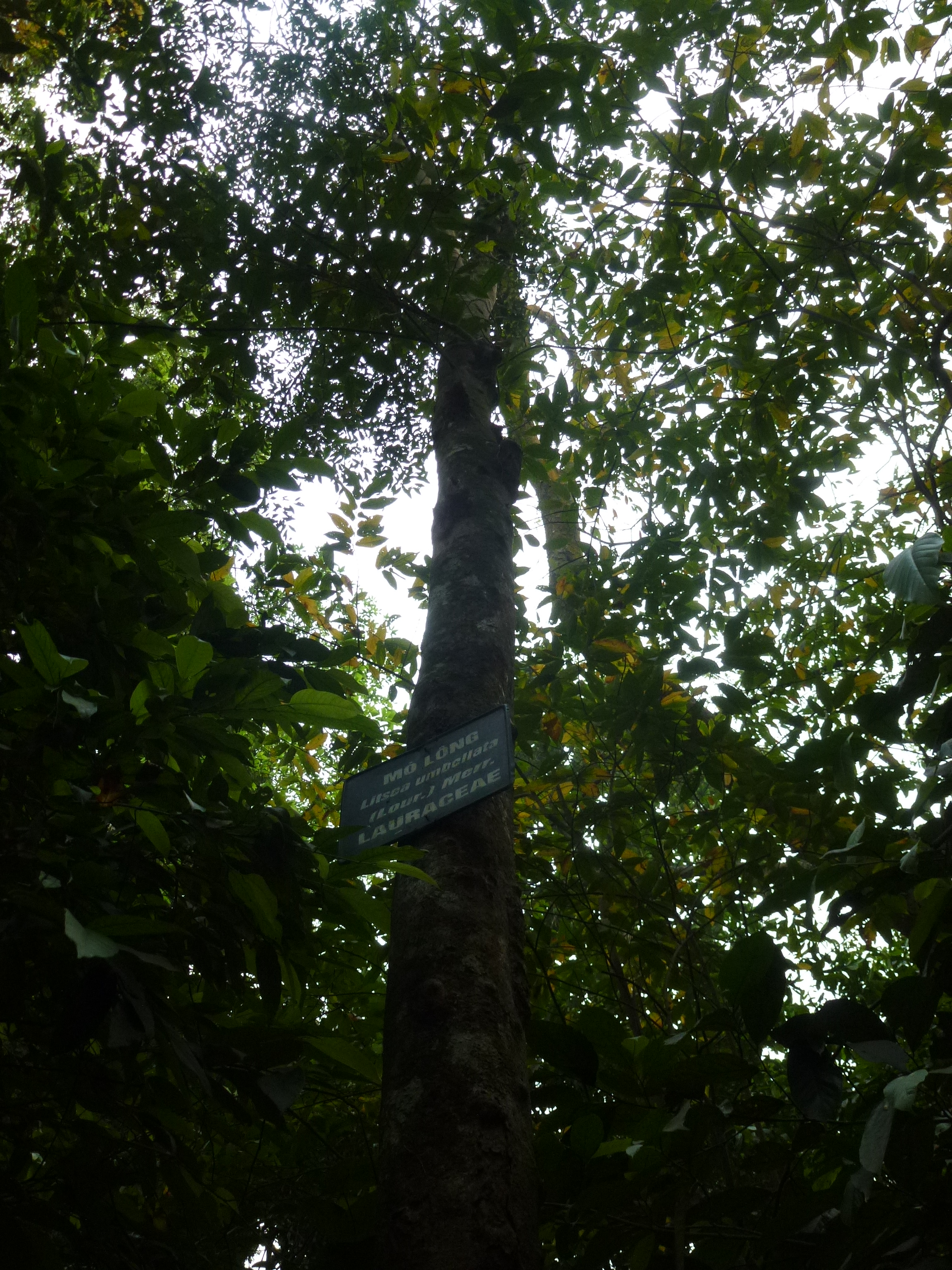

Conservation status
- Least Concern (IUCN 3.1)

Scientific classification
- Kingdom: Plantae
- Clade: Tracheophytes
- Clade: Angiosperms
- Clade: Magnoliids
- Order: Laurales
- Family: Lauraceae
- Genus: Litsea
- Species: L. umbellata

Binomial name
- Litsea umbellata (Lour.) Merr.

Synonyms
- Homotypic: Hexanthus umbellatus Lour.; Litsea hexantha Juss. ex Pers.; >20 heterotypic including: Litsea cinerascens Ridley; Litsea gracilis Gamble

= Litsea umbellata =

Species of tree

Litsea umbellata is a species of tree in the family Lauraceae. It has also been known as L. cinerascens, L. gracilis and over 20 other synonyms (some originally considered endemic species or placed in other genus synonyms such as Tetranthera or Malapoenna). The known distribution includes wet tropical areas of Bangladesh, China (S. Yunnan, SW. Guangxi) Indochina, Malesia, through to New Guinea.
