= Litsea leytensis =

Conservation status
- Near Threatened (IUCN 3.1)

Scientific classification
- Kingdom: Plantae
- Clade: Tracheophytes
- Clade: Angiosperms
- Clade: Magnoliids
- Order: Laurales
- Family: Lauraceae
- Genus: Litsea
- Species: L. leytensis

Binomial name
- Litsea leytensis Merr.

Species of flowering plant

Litsea leytensis is a species of flowering plant in the family Lauraceae. It is a tree endemic to Luzon and Leyte in the Philippines. It is threatened by habitat loss.
