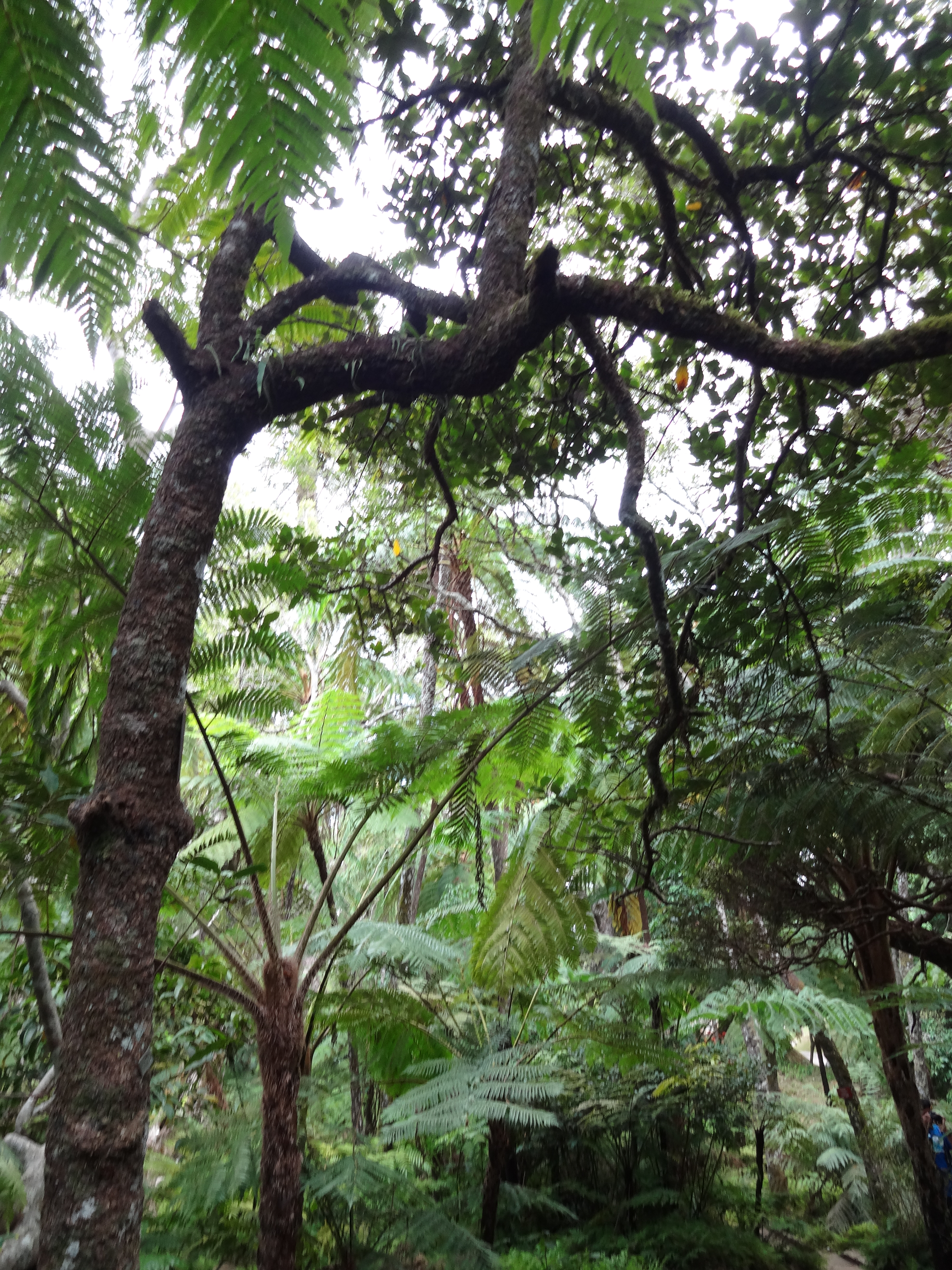
- Litsea ovalifolia in Hakgale Botanical Garden

Scientific classification
- Kingdom: Plantae
- Clade: Tracheophytes
- Clade: Angiosperms
- Clade: Magnoliids
- Order: Laurales
- Family: Lauraceae
- Genus: Litsea
- Species: L. ovalifolia

Binomial name
- Litsea ovalifolia (Wight) Trimen

Synonyms
- Lepidadenia ovalifolia Wight

= Litsea ovalifolia =

Species of flowering plant

Litsea ovalifolia is a species of plant in the family Lauraceae. It is endemic to Sri Lanka.
