= Litsea curtisii =

Conservation status
- Endangered (IUCN 3.1)

Scientific classification
- Kingdom: Plantae
- Clade: Tracheophytes
- Clade: Angiosperms
- Clade: Magnoliids
- Order: Laurales
- Family: Lauraceae
- Genus: Litsea
- Species: L. curtisii

Binomial name
- Litsea curtisii Gamble

Species of tree

Litsea curtisii is a species of plant in the family Lauraceae. It is a tree endemic to Peninsular Malaysia.
