= Litsea auriculata =

Conservation status
- Vulnerable (IUCN 3.1)

Scientific classification
- Kingdom: Plantae
- Clade: Tracheophytes
- Clade: Angiosperms
- Clade: Magnoliids
- Order: Laurales
- Family: Lauraceae
- Genus: Litsea
- Species: L. auriculata

Binomial name
- Litsea auriculata S.S.Chien & W.C.Cheng

Species of flowering plant

Litsea auriculata is a species of flowering plant in the family Lauraceae. It is a tree native to southern Anhui and Zhejiang provinces in southeastern China and to Vietnam. It is threatened by habitat loss.
