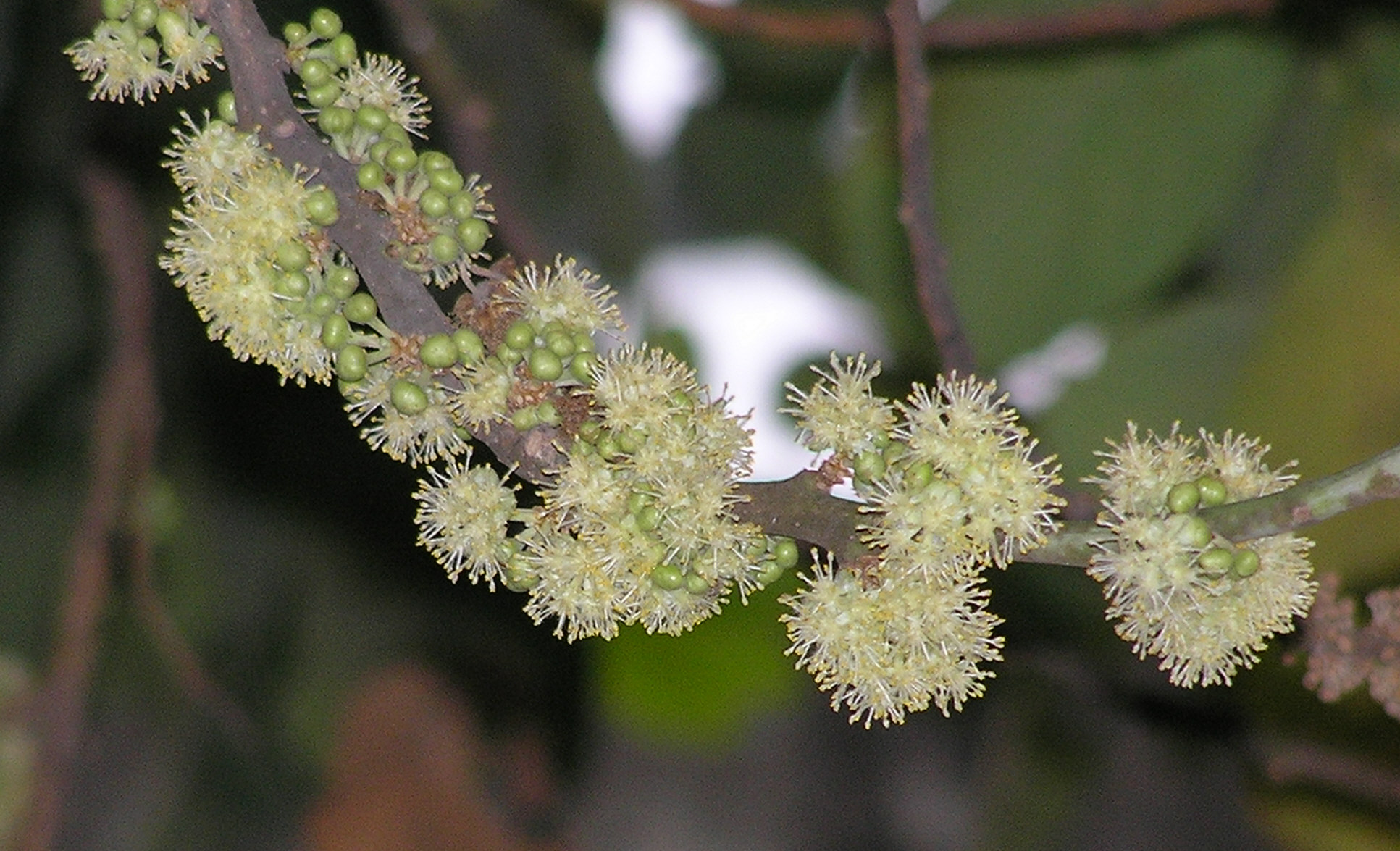

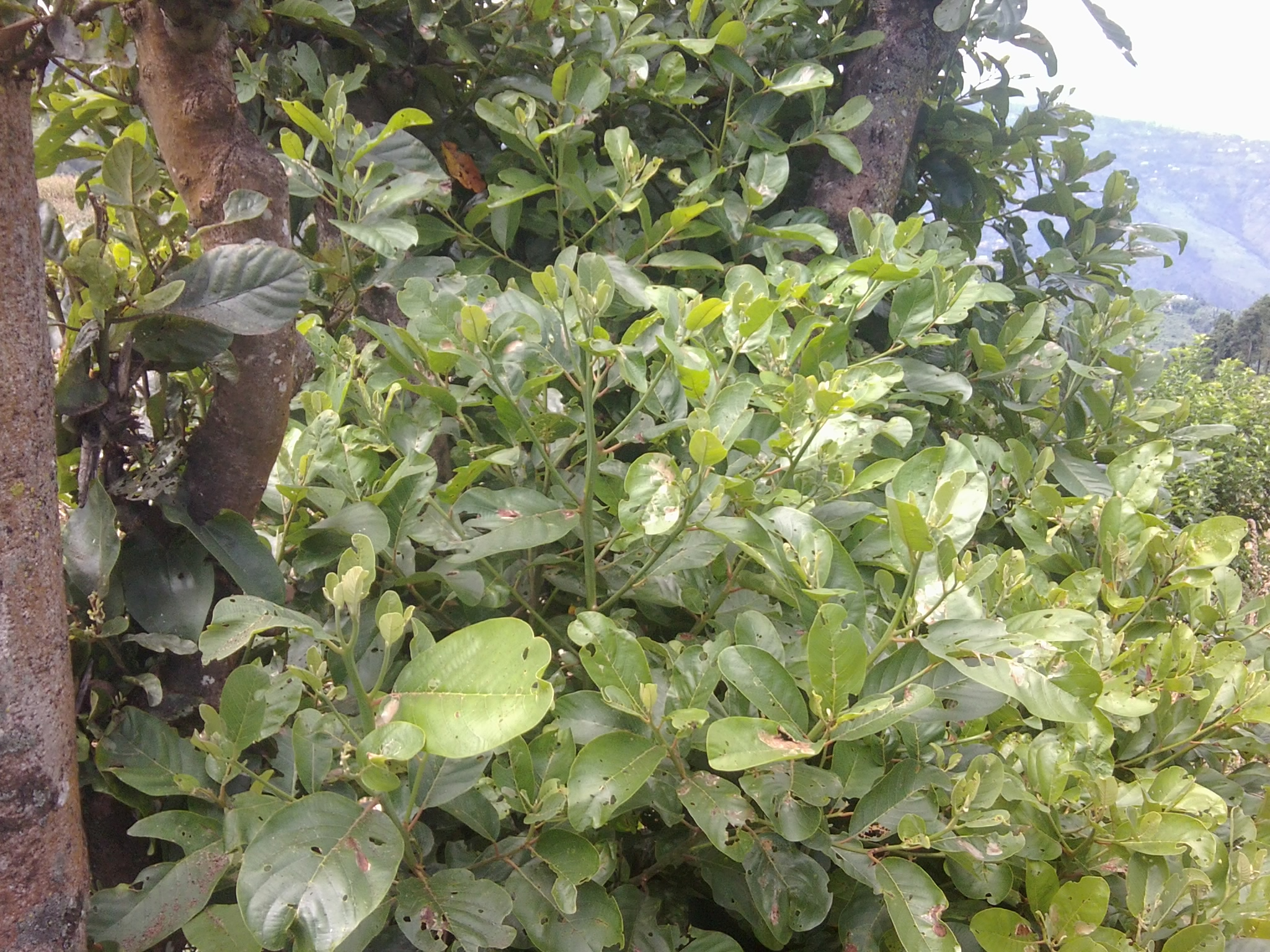

Conservation status
- Least Concern (IUCN 3.1)

Scientific classification
- Kingdom: Plantae
- Clade: Tracheophytes
- Clade: Angiosperms
- Clade: Magnoliids
- Order: Laurales
- Family: Lauraceae
- Genus: Litsea
- Species: L. monopetala

Binomial name
- Litsea monopetala (Roxb.) Pers.

Synonyms
- Litsea polyantha Juss.; Tetranthera monopetala Roxb.; Tomex monopetala (Roxb.) Hoffmanns.; Litsea hexantha Siebold ex Blume; Malapoenna monopetala Kuntze; Tetranthera alnoides Miq.; Tetranthera fruticosa Buch.-Ham. ex Meisn.; Tetranthera hexantha Sieber ex Meisn.; Tetranthera hirana Buch.-Ham. ex Wall.; Tetranthera macrophylla Roxb. ex Nees; Tetranthera quadriflora Roxb.; Tetranthera verticillata Buch.-Ham. ex Meisn.; Tetranthera villosa Bojer; Tomex pubescens Willd. ex Meisn.

= Litsea monopetala =

Species of tree

Litsea monopetala is a plant in the family Lauraceae, native to southern China, the Indian Subcontinent, Indo-China, Peninsular Malaysia, Sumatra, and Java. In Nepal, it is found in the regions from the Terai to 1450 m, in Shorea robusta forest and tropical evergreen forest. In India it is found in Assam, Odisha, Eastern Himalayas, Maharashtra (Pune, Sindhudurg) and Tamil Nadu (Coimbatore).

== Description ==
Trees grow up to a height of 18 meters with a diameter of 60 cm. The density of the wood at 15% moisture is 540 kg/cbm.

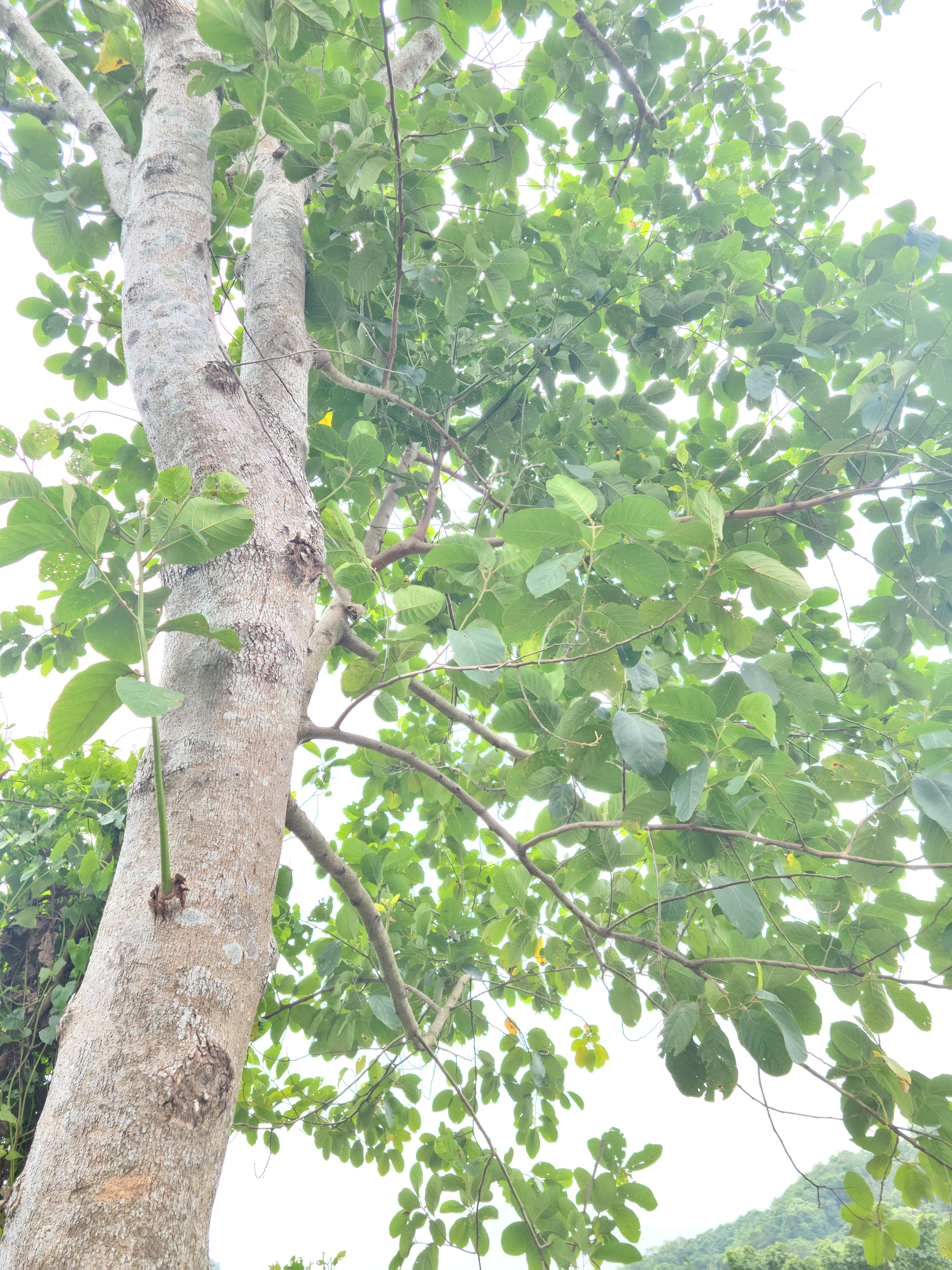
Bark
