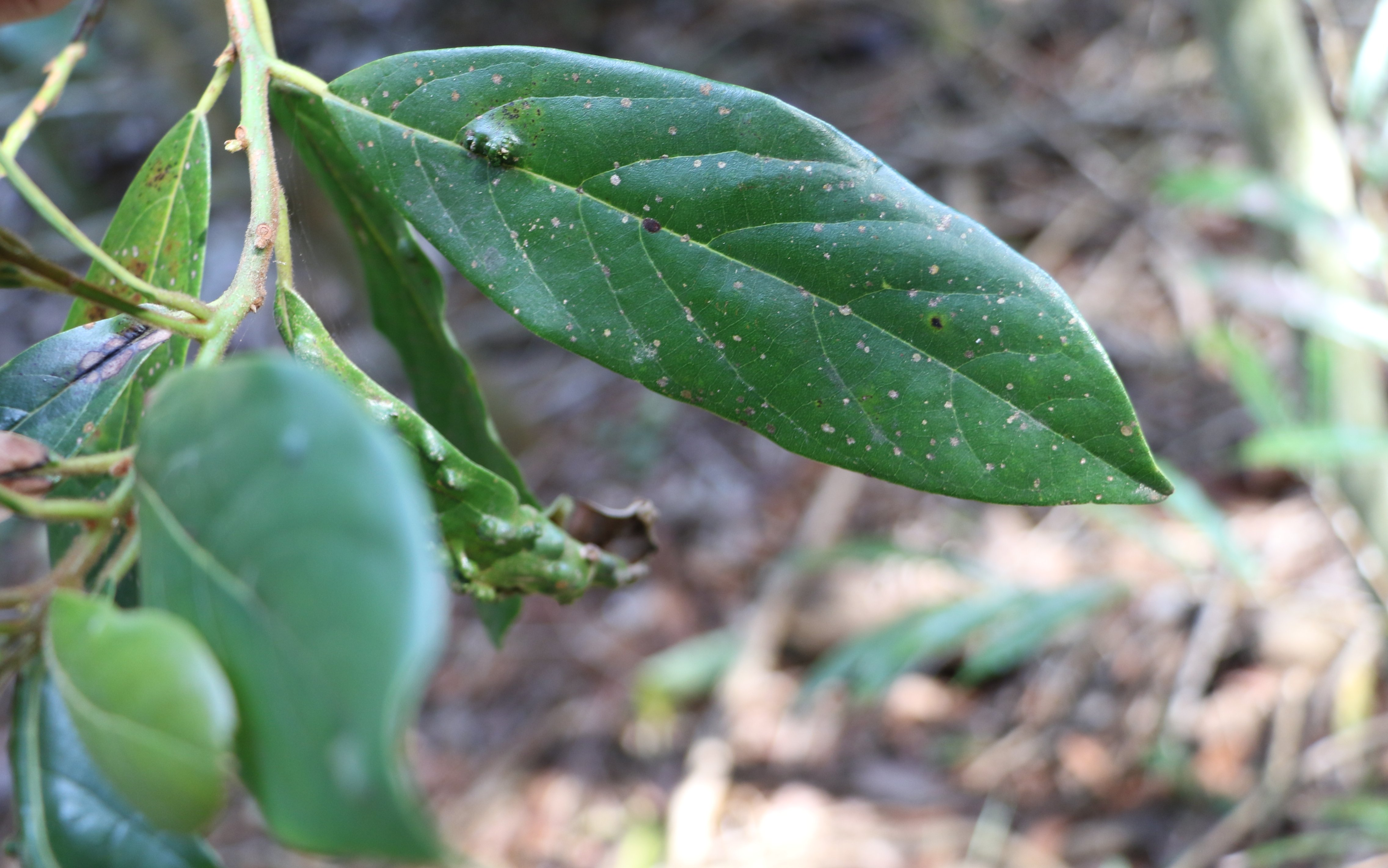
- Brown bollygum

Scientific classification
- Kingdom: Plantae
- Clade: Tracheophytes
- Clade: Angiosperms
- Clade: Magnoliids
- Order: Laurales
- Family: Lauraceae
- Genus: Litsea
- Species: L. australis

Binomial name
- Litsea australis B.Hyland

Synonyms
- Litsea leefeana (F.Muell.) Merr.

= Litsea australis =

Species of tree

Litsea australis, the brown bollygum or brown bollywood is a species of rainforest tree in the laurel family, found in eastern Australia. The specific epithet australis means "southern". As this southern population was considered to be Litsea leefeana, until reclassified by the rainforest botanist Bernie Hyland in 1989. This species is found in a variety of different rainforest types, but often seen growing near the sea. Distributed from Forster, New South Wales in the south to Fraser Island in Queensland.

== Description ==
A small to medium sized tree, up to 20 metres tall. The base of the tree is sometimes buttressed in larger individuals. Bark is rough and irregular, a reddish brown colour. Young shoots are hairy. Leaves are elliptical in shape, alternate on the stem. 8 to 13 cm long with a blunt tip, rarely to 20 cm long. The underside of the leaf is green with brown hairs. Leaf stalks 8 to 15 mm long. Leaf venation is prominent on both sides of the leaf. Tiny green or cream colour flowers form from January to June. Male and female flowers grow on separate trees. The fruit is a black drupe, eaten by a variety of rainforest birds.

== Food plant ==
Butterfly larvae and birds use this plant as a food source. Such as the wompoo fruit dove, rose-crowned fruit dove, purple moonbeam and blue triangle butterfly.

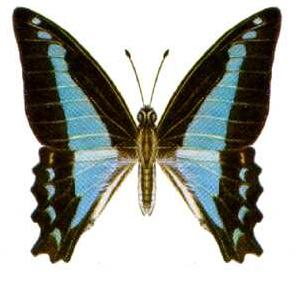
Blue Triangle Butterfly
