= Litsea glaberrima =

Conservation status
- Near Threatened (IUCN 3.1)

Scientific classification
- Kingdom: Plantae
- Clade: Tracheophytes
- Clade: Angiosperms
- Clade: Magnoliids
- Order: Laurales
- Family: Lauraceae
- Genus: Litsea
- Species: L. glaberrima

Binomial name
- Litsea glaberrima (Thwaites) Trimen

Synonyms
- Malapoenna glaberrima Kuntze; Tetranthera glaberrima Thwaites; Tetranthera nervosa Meisn.; Tetranthera nervosa var. coriacea Meisn.

Species of flowering plant

Litsea glaberrima is a species of flowering plant in the family Lauraceae. It is a tree endemic to Sri Lanka.
