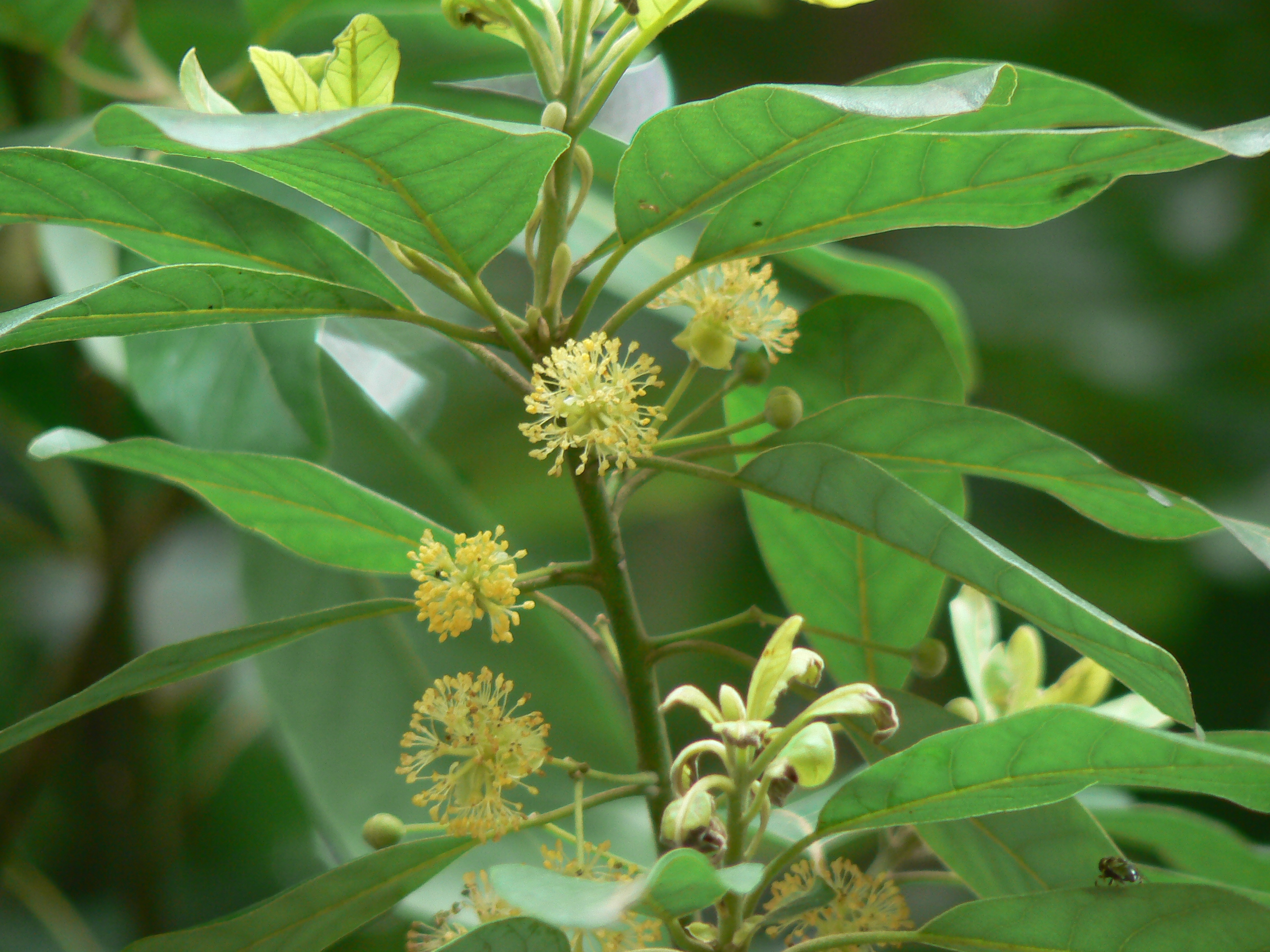
- Foliage and flowers

Conservation status
- Near Threatened (IUCN 3.1)

Scientific classification
- Kingdom: Plantae
- Clade: Tracheophytes
- Clade: Angiosperms
- Clade: Magnoliids
- Order: Laurales
- Family: Lauraceae
- Genus: Litsea
- Species: L. ligustrina

Binomial name
- Litsea ligustrina (Nees) Fern.-Vill.

Synonyms
- 25 synonyms: Litsea quinqueflora Suresh; Malapoenna ligustrina (Nees) Kuntze; Tetranthera ligustrina Nees; Actinodaphne quinqueflora (Dennst.) M.R.Almeida & S.M.Almeida; Darwinia quinqueflora Dennst.; Litsea cauliflora Trimen; Litsea caulostachys Kosterm.; Litsea chinensis B.Heyne ex Nees; Litsea deccanensis Gamble; Litsea hookeriana (Meisn.) Hook.f.; Litsea longifolia (Nees) Trimen; Litsea sebifera var. tomentosa (Nees) Hook.f.; Litsea thwaitesii N.P.Balakr.; Litsea tomentosa (Nees) B.Heyne ex Hook.f.; Litsea undulata Hook.f.; Malapoenna hookeriana (Meisn.) Kuntze; Malapoenna longifolia (Nees) Kuntze; Malapoenna undulata (Hook.f.) Kuntze; Sebifera balongy Blanco; Tetranthera cauliflora Moon; Tetranthera celastroides Miq. ex Meisn.; Tetranthera hookeriana Meisn.; Tetranthera laurifolia Wall. ex Nees; Tetranthera ligustrina var. celastroides Miq. ex Meisn.; Tetranthera longifolia Nees; Tetranthera longifolia var. nitida Meisn.; Tetranthera tomentosa Nees; Tetranthera velutina Blume

= Litsea ligustrina =

Species of flowering plant

Litsea ligustrina is a species of plant in the family Lauraceae native to Bangladesh, India, Myanmar, Pakistan, Sri Lanka, where it grows in submontane forest. The leaves are simple, alternate; lamina obovate to oblanceolate or elliptic; apex obtuse to acute; base acute to cuneate with entire margin. The flowers show umbel inflorescence, and the fruit is a one-seeded berry.
