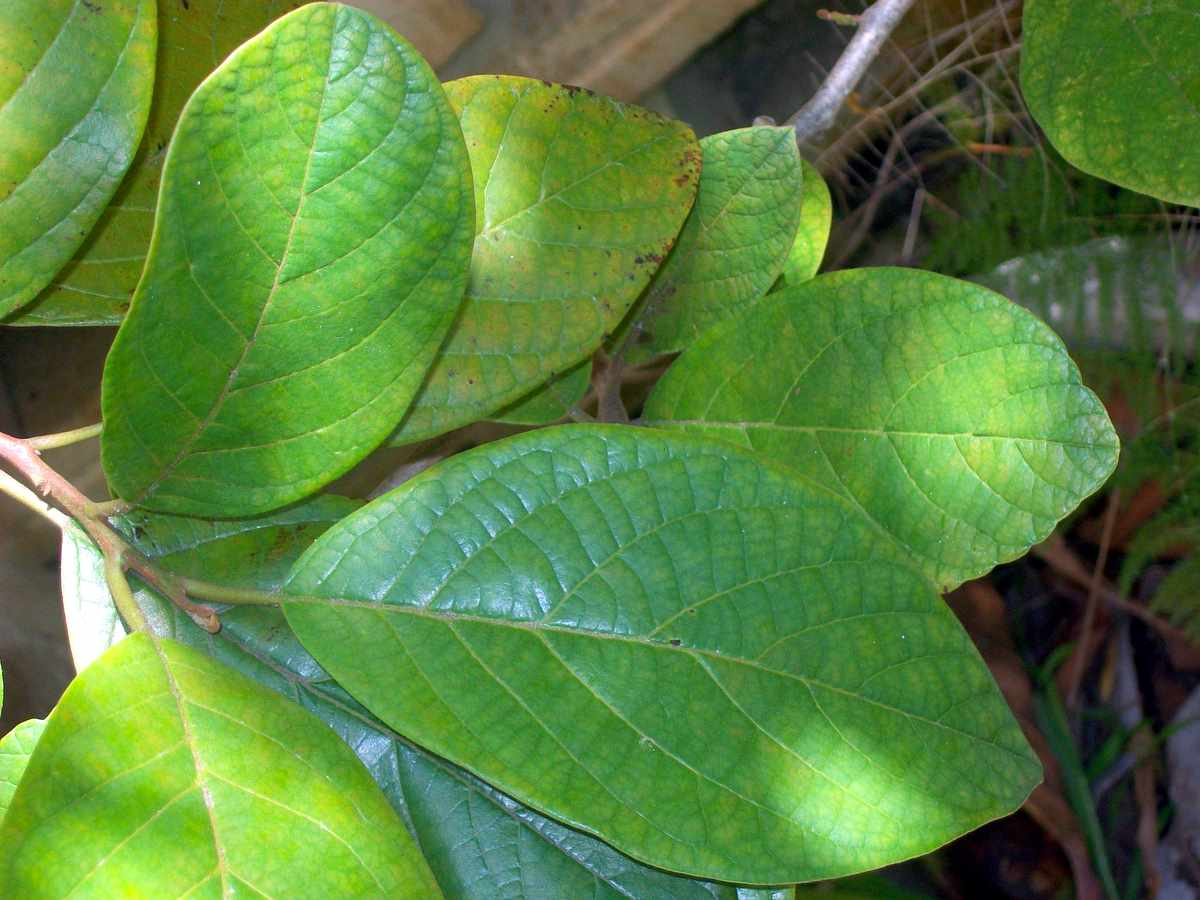
- In Topaz Road National Park, Australia

Conservation status
- Least Concern (IUCN 3.1)

Scientific classification
- Kingdom: Plantae
- Clade: Tracheophytes
- Clade: Angiosperms
- Clade: Magnoliids
- Order: Laurales
- Family: Lauraceae
- Genus: Litsea
- Species: L. leefeana

Binomial name
- Litsea leefeana (F.Muell.) Merr.

Synonyms
- Cyclicodaphne leefeeana F.Muell.

= Litsea leefeana =

Species of tree

Litsea leefeana, known as the brown bolly gum or brown bollywood is a rainforest tree in the laurel family. A small to medium-sized tree endemic to the rainforests of tropical Queensland, Australia.

The specific epithet is named after a Mr. Leefe, a botanical collector from the Kennedy district of northern Queensland. It is one of eleven species in the large Asian genus Litsea to reach Australia.

After study by Bernard Hyland, the southern Queensland and New South Wales populations of what was known as this plant have been renamed Litsea australis.

Leaves are elliptical in shape, alternate on the stem. 8 to 13 cm long with a blunt tip. Leaf venation is prominent and attractive on both sides of the leaf. Green or cream colour flowers form from leaf scars on the branchlets or in the leaf axils. The fruit is a black drupe, eaten by a variety of rainforest birds. Regeneration is not difficult from fresh seed, if the black aril is removed.

Litsea leefeana is suited as a garden plant in situations free from frost. Young plants need protection from winds, as well as plenty of shade and moisture.

== Butterflies ==
Many butterfly larvae eat the leaves of this plant, including Chaetocneme beata, Chaetocneme critomedia, Chaetocneme porphyropis, Graphium sarpedon, Philiris diana, Trapezites phigalia, Trapezites petalia, and Caloptilia oenopella.

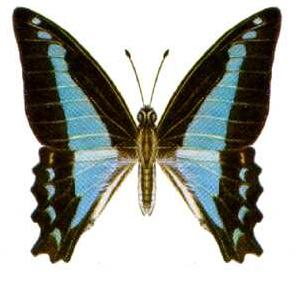
Common bluebottle, Graphium sarpedon
