= Litsea gardneri =

Conservation status
- Vulnerable (IUCN 3.1)

Scientific classification
- Kingdom: Plantae
- Clade: Tracheophytes
- Clade: Angiosperms
- Clade: Magnoliids
- Order: Laurales
- Family: Lauraceae
- Genus: Litsea
- Species: L. gardneri

Binomial name
- Litsea gardneri Meisn.

Species of flowering plant

Litsea gardneri is a species of flowering plant in the family Lauraceae. It is a tree endemic to Sri Lanka. It is known as "talan - තලන්" in Sinhala.
