= Litsea connorsii =

- Botanical illustration

Conservation status
- Least Concern (IUCN 3.1)

Scientific classification
- Kingdom: Plantae
- Clade: Tracheophytes
- Clade: Angiosperms
- Clade: Magnoliids
- Order: Laurales
- Family: Lauraceae
- Genus: Litsea
- Species: L. connorsii

Binomial name
- Litsea connorsii B.Hyland

Species of flowering plant

Litsea connorsii is a species of plant in the family Lauraceae native to northeast Queensland, Australia. It is a rainforest tree, first described in 1989. It has a conservation status of least concern.

== Description ==
Litsea connorsii is a large tree that may grow to about 30 m (98 ft) in height and 60 cm (24 in) diameter. The trunk is usually buttressed. The leaves are green above and the underside is covered in pale hairs when young. They are generally about 9 cm (3.5 in) long and 3 cm (1.2 in) wide, the midrib is depressed in the upper surface and there are between six and nine pairs of lateral veins branching from it. The petiole averages about 1.1 cm (0.4 in) in length.

The inflorescence is a raceme or umbel which emerges from the leaf axils or from the twigs below the leaves. Flowers are pale green to cream or yellow and are faintly scented. They have four to eight tepals (usually six) in a single whorl, each about 2 mm (0.08 in) long. The fruit is an ellipsoid drupe, reddish when immature and ripening to black. They measure up to 1.9 cm (0.7 in) long and 1.3 cm (0.5 in) wide and contain a single brown seed about 0.9 cm (0.4 in) long.

== Distribution ==
It grows in upland rainforest, with a preference for granite based acidic soils, from near Cooktown to the Paluma Range National Park. The altitudinal range is from 600 to 1,200 m (2,000 to 3,900 ft).

== Taxonomy ==
The species was first described in 1989 by Australian botanist Bernard Hyland, in his 367-page revision of the Lauraceae family in Australia.

=== Etymology ===
The species epithet 'connorsii' is in honour of John R. Connors, an Australian botanist.

== Conservation ==
This species was assessed by the International Union for Conservation of Nature (IUCN) in 2020 and found to be of least concern. It has been given the same rating by the Queensland Government in its Wildnet database under the Nature Conservation Act. In its statement, the IUCN cites the species' widespread distribution and the lack of any major threats having been identified as the basis for the assessment. The Wildnet database does not provide any explanations for its assessments.
