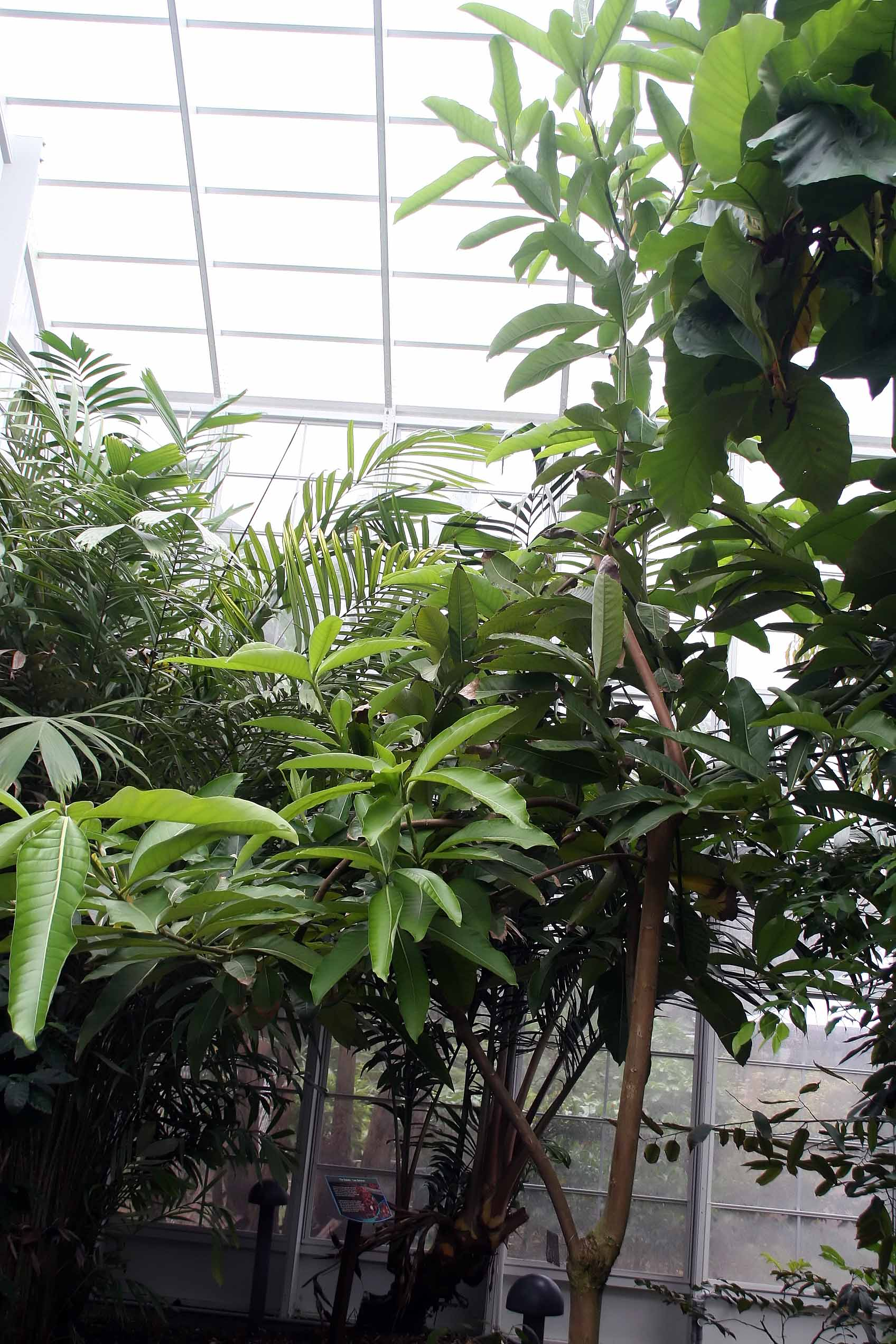
- Young Litsea garciae tree at the Fairchild Tropical Botanic Garden, Miami, Florida

Conservation status
- Least Concern (IUCN 3.1)

Scientific classification
- Kingdom: Plantae
- Clade: Tracheophytes
- Clade: Angiosperms
- Clade: Magnoliids
- Order: Laurales
- Family: Lauraceae
- Genus: Litsea
- Species: L. garciae

Binomial name
- Litsea garciae S.Vidal (1886)

Synonyms
- Cylicodaphne garciae (Vidal) Nakai; Lepidadenia kawakamii (Hayata) Masam.; Litsea griseola Elmer; Litsea kawakamii Hayata; Tetradenia kawakamii (Hayata) Nemoto ex Makino & Nemoto

= Litsea garciae =

Species of plant

Litsea garciae, also known as engkala, engkalak, kangkala, pangalaban and Borneo avocado, is a flowering plant belonging to the family Lauraceae. It is native to Taiwan, the Philippines, Borneo, the Malay Peninsula, Sumatra, Java, and Sulawesi.

Litsea garciae is notable for its use in traditional medicine and as a source of essential oils. Its fruits contain high levels of phytochemicals which are antioxidants, and stearic acid which has shown to have antibacterial properties.

== Other names ==
Litsea garciae has many common names across its native range.

In Indonesia, it is commonly known as kalangkala, medang, malai, wuru lilin, kelimah, bua talal, kelime, kelimie, bua' vengolobon, wi lahal, kelima, mali, beva' mali, kayu mali, and malei.

In Malaysia, it is commonly known as ta'ang, pengalaban, pengolaban, tebulus, buah pengalaban, buah tebuluh, and pong labon.

In the Philippines, it is commonly known as kupa, pipi, bagnolo, and bangulo, and in Taiwan as lan yu mu jiang zi and lan yu mu.

== Distribution ==
L. garciae is generally believed to have originated in the Philippines, although some botanists believe it originated in Borneo. It grows wild in evergreen, broad-leaved forests and in disturbed, open sites up to 200 meters (660 feet) in elevation. It is often found along rivers and on hillsides with sandy to clay soils, and prefers partly shady positions.

== Description ==
Litsea garciae is a sub-canopy, medium to large evergreen tree which grows 10–26 meters (33–85 feet) in height. The trunk can reach 60 centimeters (24 inches) in diameter.

The dark green leaves are simple and alternately arranged and are lanceolate-ovate or lanceolate-obovate in shape. They are glabrous and measure 25–40 centimeters (9.8–15.7 inches) in length and 6–15 centimeters (2.4–5.9 inches) in width. They droop slightly from the branches. The flowers are small and yellow-white in color. The flower head measures 15 millimeters in diameter.

The plant bears fruit at five years of age. The tree does not tolerate frost or temperatures below 55 °F (13 °C).

=== Fruit ===
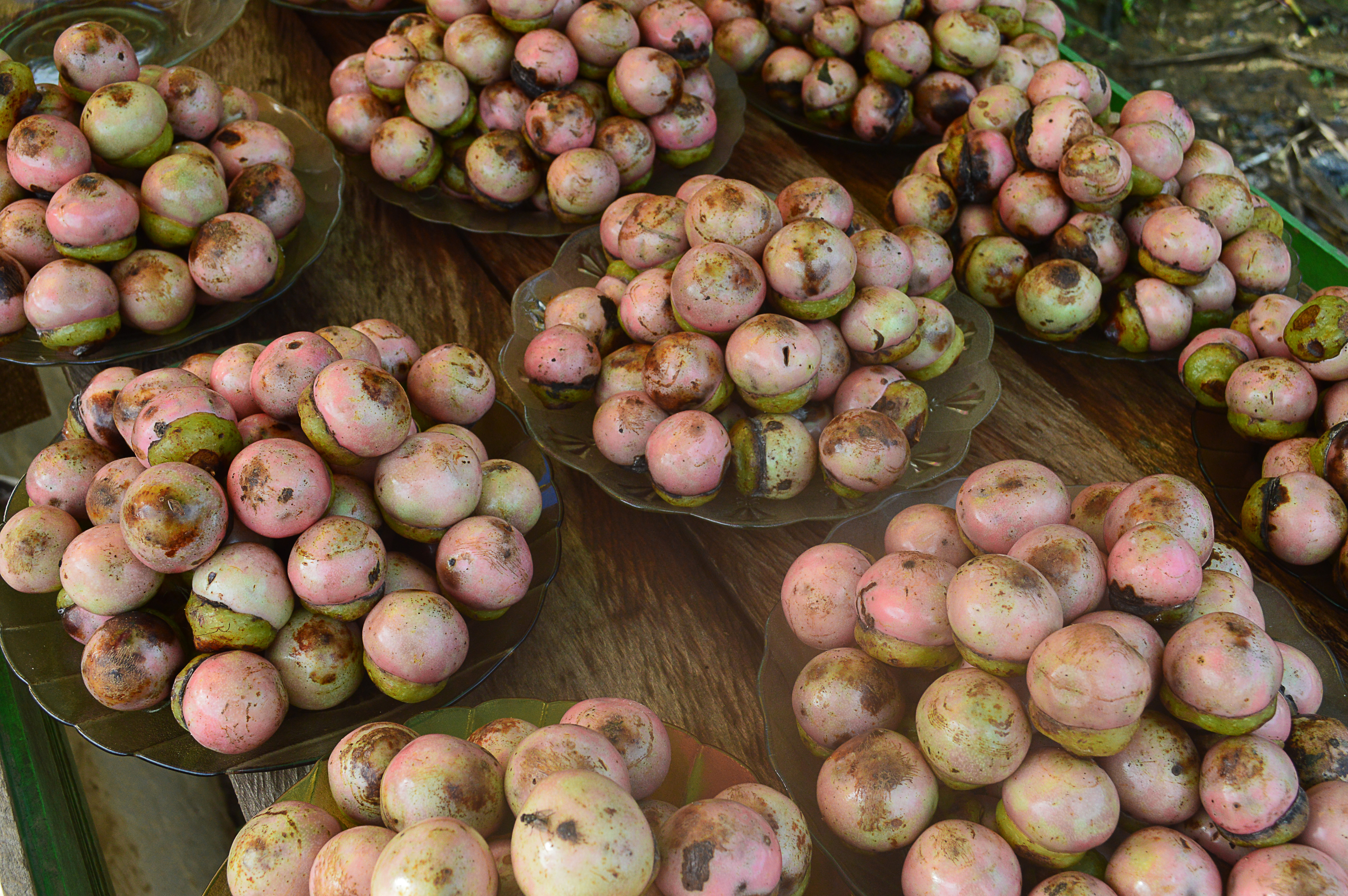
Fruits of Litsea garciae

The fruit is oblate to globose in shape and measures 2.2–3 centimeters (0.87–1.18 inches) in height and 2.5–4.5 centimeters (0.98–1.77 inches) in diameter. It is edible and is said to have a milky, avocado-like flavor. When unripe, the skin is a pale whitish-green, and when ripe is pink to red in color. The inner flesh is soft and white in color, sometimes with a greenish tint. The stem cap is large and green in color. It contains 1 large, brown seed which measures 1.5–2 centimeters (0.59–0.79 inches) in diameter.

== Uses ==
Litsea garciae fruit, raw
Vitamins and minerals
Vitamins	Quantity %DV^{†}
Vitamin C	4% 3.4 mg
Minerals	Quantity %DV^{†}
Calcium	1% 7 mg
Copper	29% 0.26 mg
Iron	3% 0.5 mg
Magnesium	4% 17 mg
Manganese	22% 0.5 mg
Phosphorus	2% 26 mg
Potassium	12% 355 mg
Zinc	11% 1.2 mg
- ^{†}Percentages estimated using US recommendations for adults, except for potassium, which is estimated based on expert recommendation from the National Academies.

The fruit is eaten raw or cooked, and the tree is sometimes cultivated for its fruit. When eaten raw, it is rolled in the hands or hit with a spoon to cause slight bruising in order to release the flavor. A popular way of eating the fruit is to submerge it in hot water for five minutes, then sprinkle it with salt. It is sometimes served steamed with rice. Unripe fruits are pickled. An oil is extracted from the seed, which is used to make candles and soap. The wood is used in construction. Litsea garciae has many medicinal uses. The Iban use the lightly burned bark to treat caterpillar stings, and use a bark poultice to treat boils. The Selako use a poultice of the leaves or shoots along with shallot and fennel seeds to cure infections and skin diseases. It is also used to treat skin burns. The Penan use a bark poultice for sprained knees, ankles, and muscular pains. Decoctions made from the bark are also used to help ailments such as blood in stools, and are mixed with durian bark to make an antidote for snakebite wounds.

== Chemistry ==
Litsea garciae fruits contain a high amount of phytochemicals, which has potential as a natural antioxidant that can contribute to human health. Phenolic and flavonoid content was highest in the stem cap, with the values of 8.29 ± 0.70 milligrams gallic acid and 6.90 ± 0.61 milligrams rutin, respectively. Anthocyanin content was highest in the flesh of the fruit, with the value of 4.12 ± 0.10 milligrams cyanidin-3-glucoside. The same trend of antioxidant and phytochemical content was also found in the distilled water extract. The fruit is also rich in stearic acid and contains antibacterial properties.

== See also ==
- List of culinary fruits
