= Litsea hirsutissima =

Conservation status
- Least Concern (IUCN 3.1)

Scientific classification
- Kingdom: Plantae
- Clade: Tracheophytes
- Clade: Angiosperms
- Clade: Magnoliids
- Order: Laurales
- Family: Lauraceae
- Genus: Litsea
- Species: L. hirsutissima

Binomial name
- Litsea hirsutissima Gamble

Synonyms
- Litsea amara var. fuscotomentosa (Meisn.) Hook.f.; Litsea hirsutior Kosterm.; Litsea hirsutissima var. geniculata Gamble; Litsea umbellata var. fuscotomentosa (Meisn.) I.M.Turner; Tetranthera amara var. fuscotomentosa Meisn.

Species of tree

Litsea hirsutissima is a species of plant in the family Lauraceae. It is endemic to Peninsular Malaysia. It is threatened by habitat loss.
