= Litsea leiantha =

Conservation status
- Endangered (IUCN 3.1)

Scientific classification
- Kingdom: Plantae
- Clade: Tracheophytes
- Clade: Angiosperms
- Clade: Magnoliids
- Order: Laurales
- Family: Lauraceae
- Genus: Litsea
- Species: L. leiantha

Binomial name
- Litsea leiantha (Kurz) Hook.f.

Synonyms
- Tetranthera leiantha Kurz; Malapoenna leiantha Kuntze

Species of flowering plant

Litsea leiantha is a species of flowering plant in the family Lauraceae. It is endemic to South Andaman Island, an island in the Indian Ocean. It is threatened by habitat loss.
