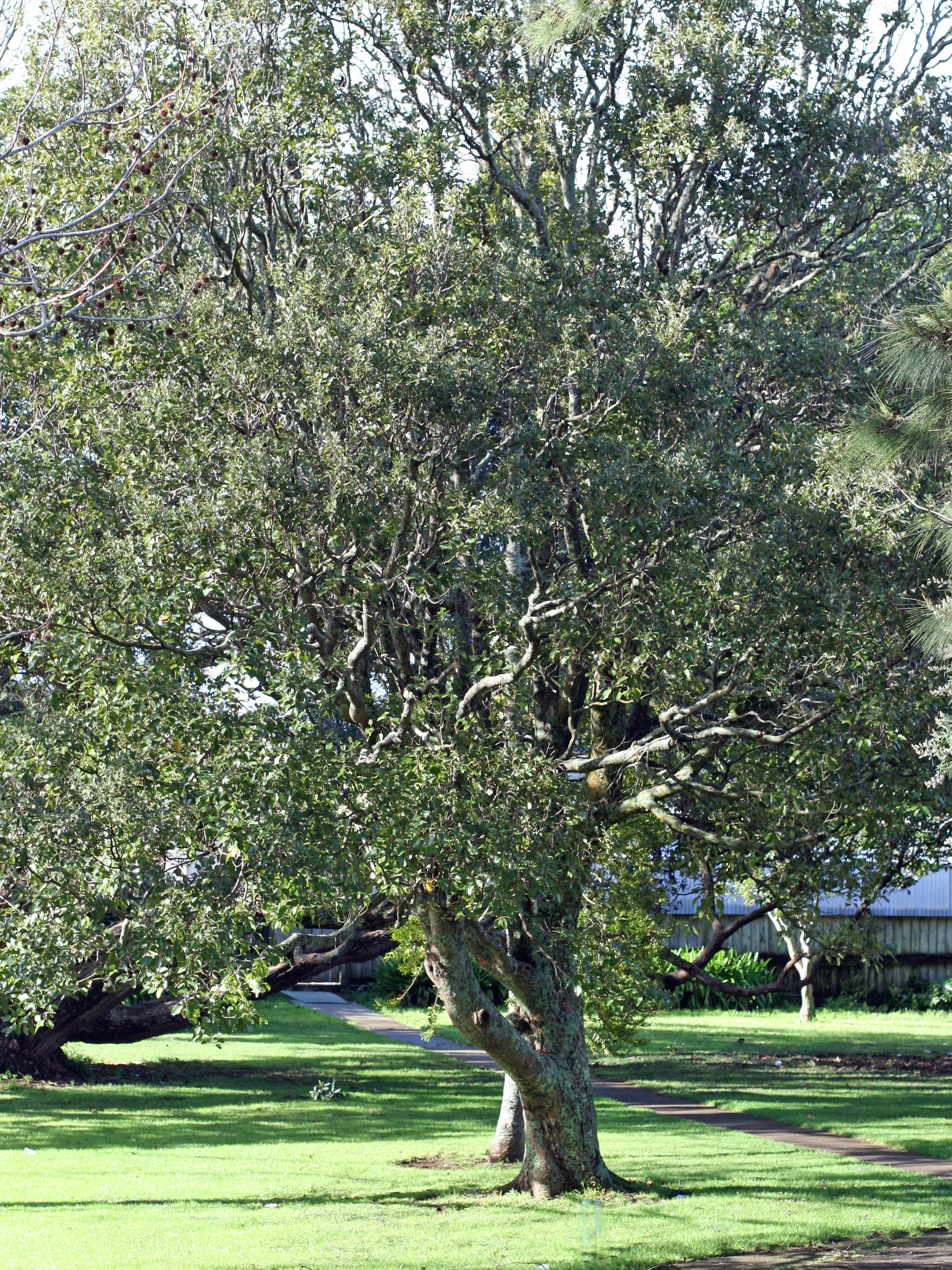

Conservation status
- Least Concern (IUCN 3.1)

Scientific classification
- Kingdom: Plantae
- Clade: Embryophytes
- Clade: Tracheophytes
- Clade: Angiosperms
- Clade: Magnoliids
- Order: Laurales
- Family: Lauraceae
- Genus: Litsea
- Species: L. calicaris

Binomial name
- Litsea calicaris (Sol. ex A.Cunn.) Benth. & Hook.f. ex Kirk
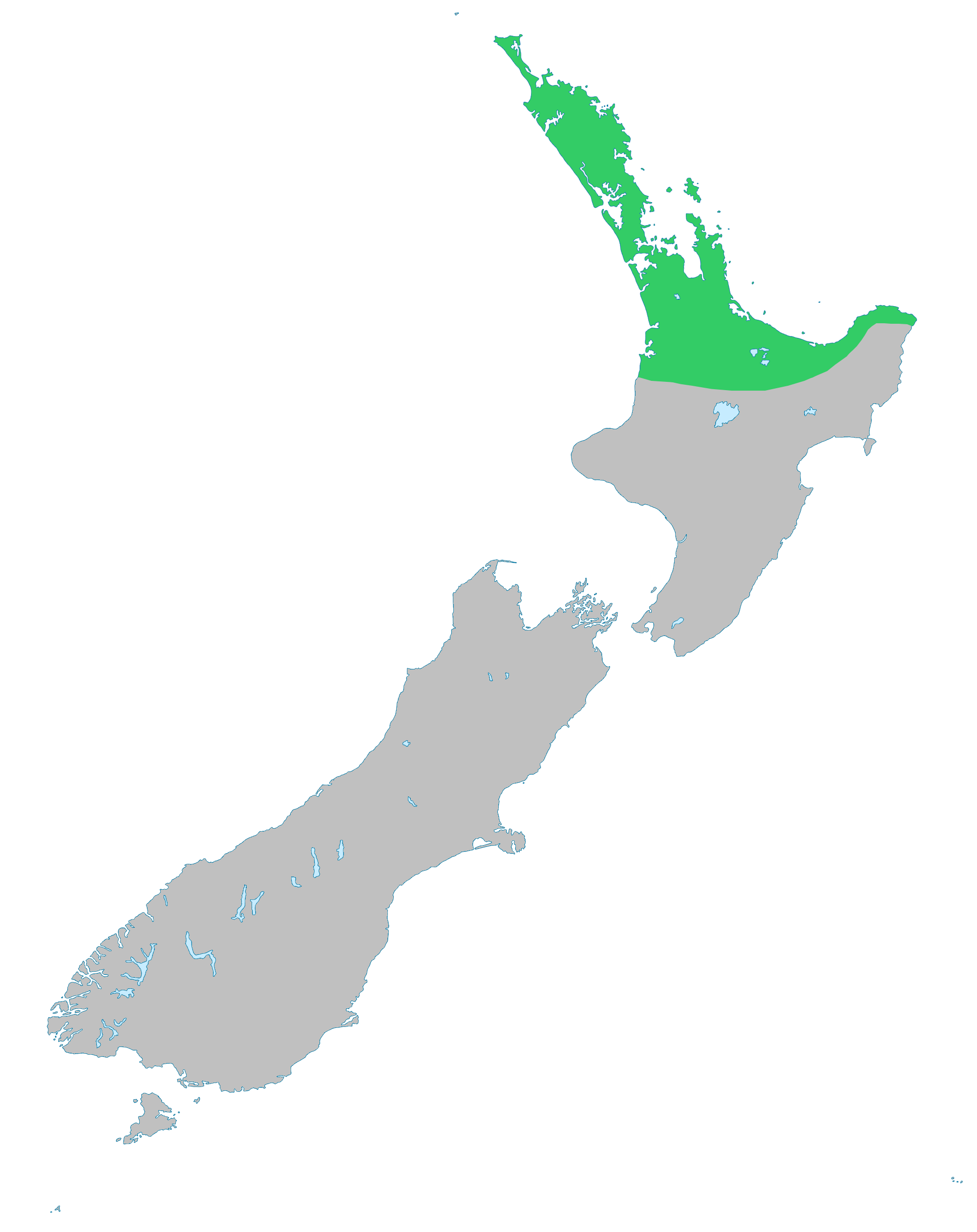
- Natural range of L. calicaris

Synonyms
- Laurus calicaris Sol. ex A.Cunn.; Malapoenna calicaris (Sol. ex A.Cunn.) Kuntze; Tetranthera calicaris (Sol. ex A.Cunn.) Hook.f.; Tetranthera tangao R.Cunn. ex Meisn.

= Litsea calicaris =

Mangeao

Species of tree

Litsea calicaris, the mangeao, is a specie of evergreen tree endemic to the North Island of New Zealand, occurring in lowland forest from near North Cape south to about 38°S. It belongs to the Laurel family, Lauraceae.

== Description ==
Mangeao is the only New Zealand representative of the genus Litsea which consists of 200–400 species of evergreen or deciduous trees or shrubs in tropical and subtropical Asia, Australia, North America and South America. There are more than 70 species in China, mostly in warm regions in the south and southwest. Mangeao grows up to 15 metres (49 ft) in height, and has smooth dark greyish brown bark. The leaves are opposite, 5–15 centimetres (2.0–5.9 in) long, ovate or ovate-oblong, and bluish-green below. The flowers are small, in umbels of 4 to 5, the fruit is an oblong-ovoid drupe, 2 millimetres (0.079 in) long, reddish and seated on a disc.

A tree planted by the Reverend Richard Taylor in 1860 was measured about 120 years later as 13 m (43 ft) tall with a trunk diameter of 92 cm (36 in). Mangeao is commonest in the southern part of its range, especially in the hill country between Te Kūiti and the west coast, and in the Kaimai Ranges between Katikati and Rotorua. Thriving best on limestone-derived soils or heavy clays, mangeao requires good drainage and has low tolerance of drought conditions. Young trees are very frost tender.

== Uses ==
Mangeao produces high-quality timber with excellent strength and flexibility. The wood is white, firm, and strong, combining toughness with elasticity and light weight. In the 19th century it was used for many purposes including the making of barrels and wheels, and for boat frames, railway carriages and sporting goods. It also produces a high quality sliced veneer. Current uses are in the making of violins and for the ribs of kayaks. It was also used for the 9th floor of the Beehive building (the executive wing of the Parliament of New Zealand). The Māori are said to have used it for its medicinal properties.

== Threats ==
Apart from the threat posed by forest clearance, mangeao suffers badly from browsing by possums. The IUCN Red List assesses the species as least concern.

== Gallery ==
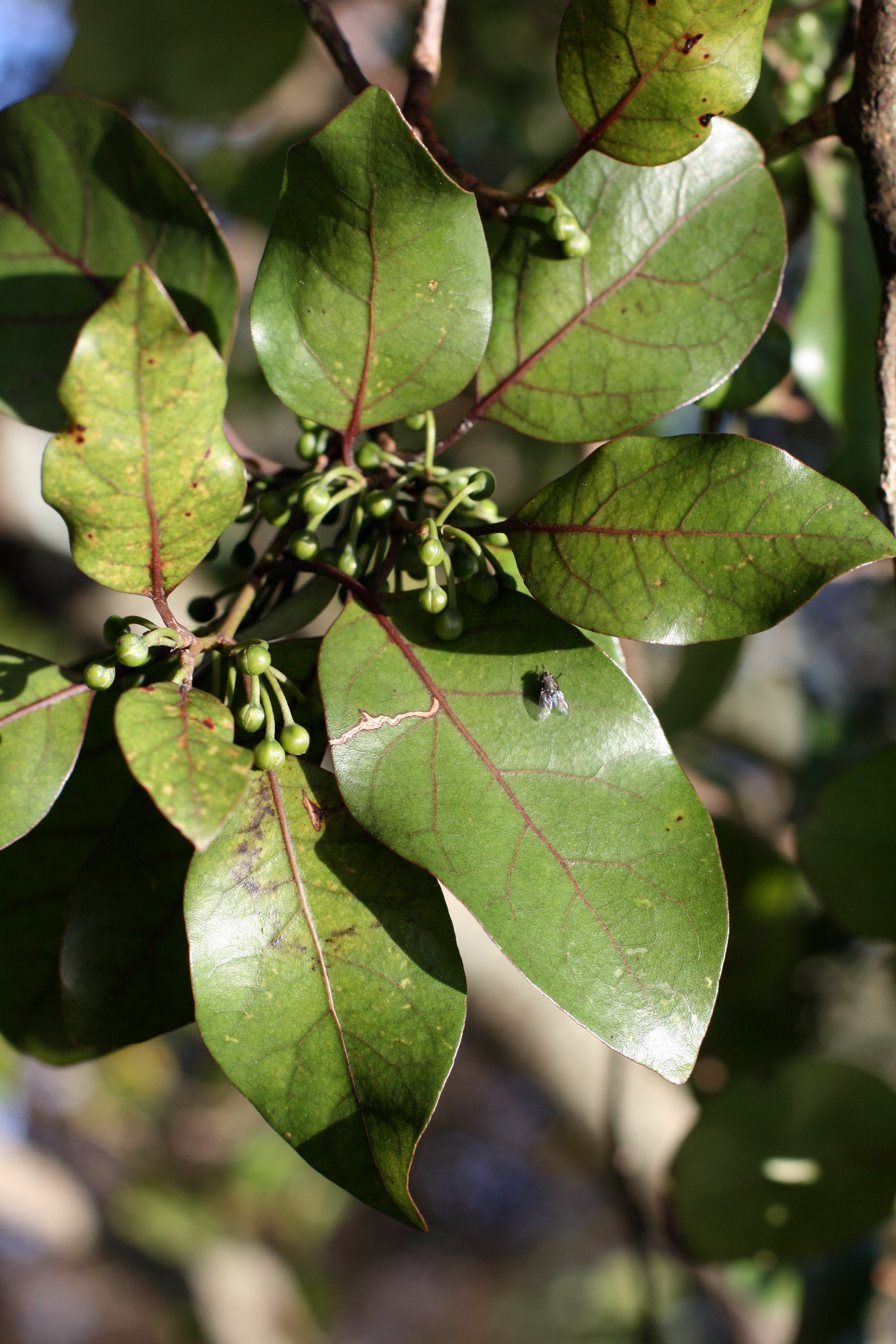
Mangeao leaves with prominent veins

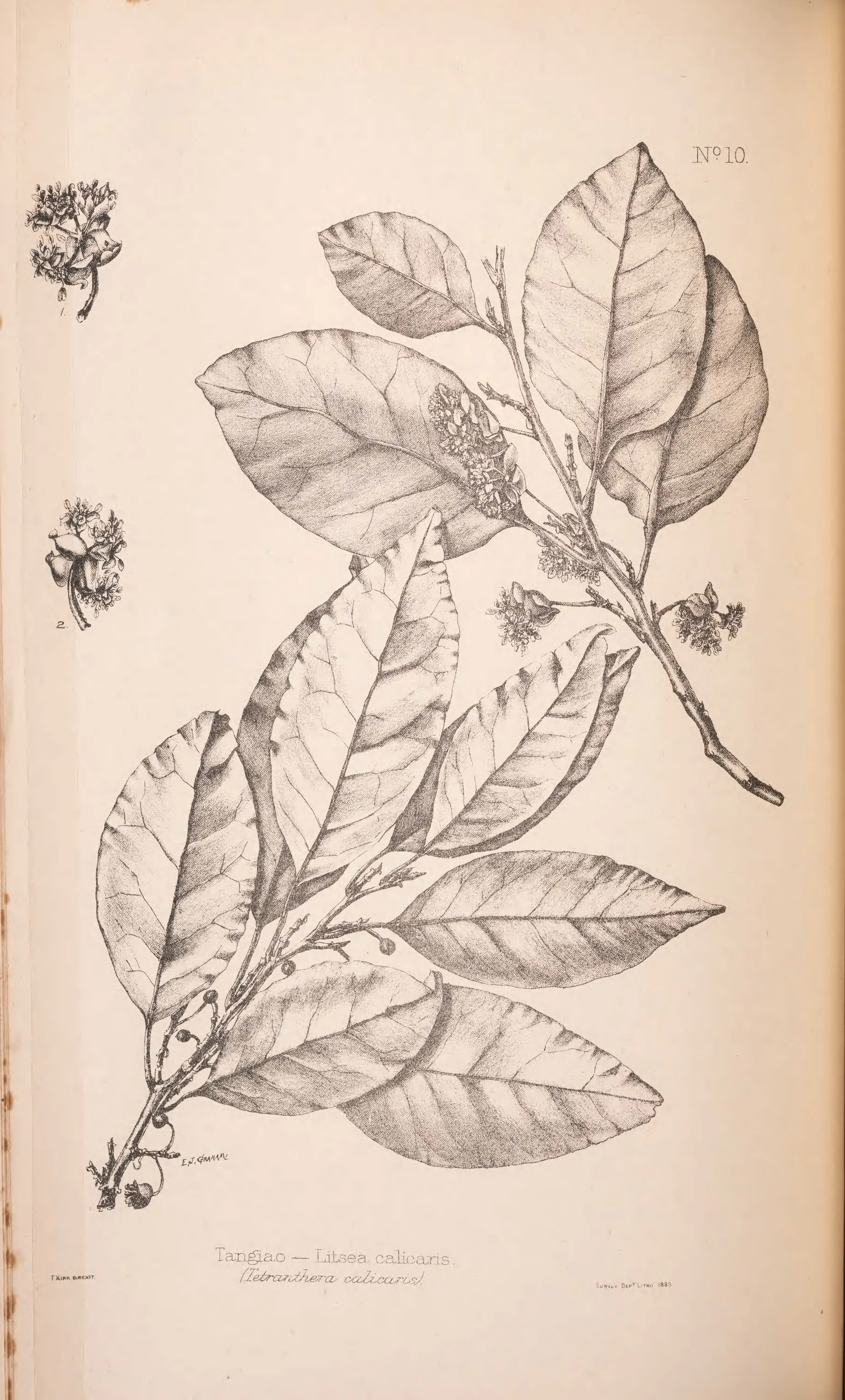
Illustration of Mangeao

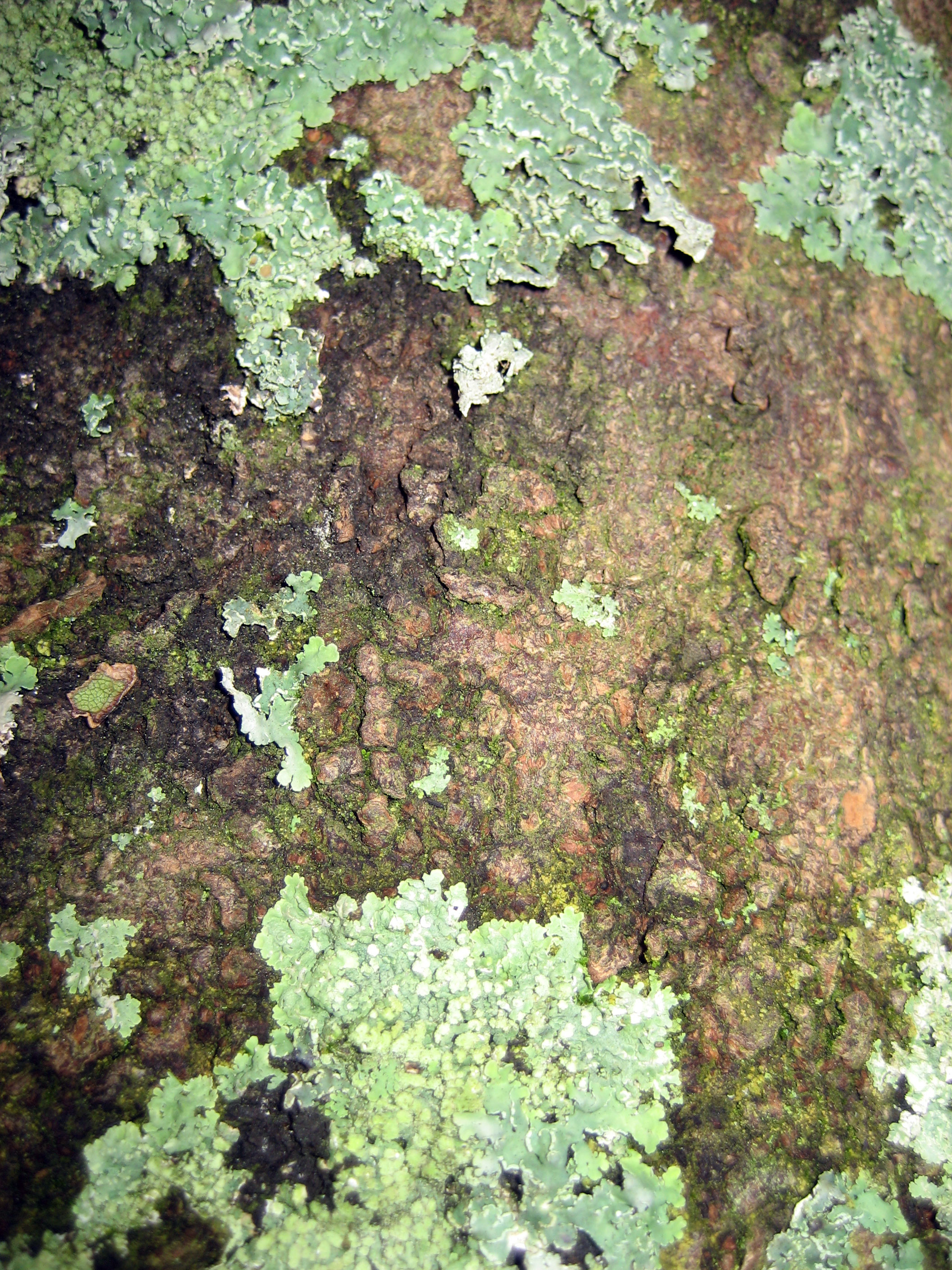
Lichens on Mangeao bark
