= Litsea travancorica =

Conservation status
- Vulnerable (IUCN 3.1)

Scientific classification
- Kingdom: Plantae
- Clade: Tracheophytes
- Clade: Angiosperms
- Clade: Magnoliids
- Order: Laurales
- Family: Lauraceae
- Genus: Litsea
- Species: L. travancorica

Binomial name
- Litsea travancorica Gamble

Species of flowering plant

Litsea travancorica is a species of plant in the family Lauraceae. It is a tree that grows from 7 to 10 metres tall. It is endemic to the Western Ghats of southern India, in the states of Karnataka, Kerala, and Tamil Nadu. It grows in semi-evergreen and evergreen montane rain forests from 800 to 1,200 metres elevation.
