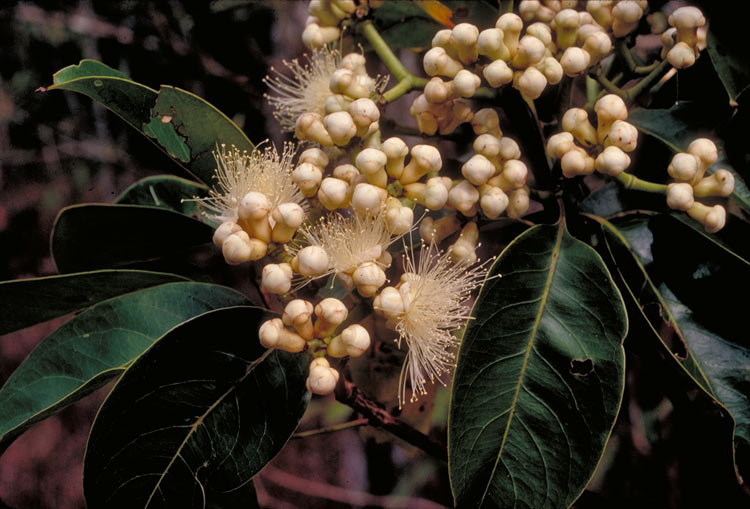
- Flowers of Syzygium bamagense

Conservation status
- Least Concern (NCA)

Scientific classification
- Kingdom: Plantae
- Clade: Tracheophytes
- Clade: Angiosperms
- Clade: Eudicots
- Clade: Rosids
- Order: Myrtales
- Family: Myrtaceae
- Genus: Syzygium
- Species: S. bamagense

Binomial name
- Syzygium bamagense B.Hyland

= Syzygium bamagense =

Species of flowering plant

Syzygium bamagense is a species of tree in the myrtle family Myrtaceae. It is endemic to Queensland, Australia.

== Description ==
It grows as a perennial, and can reach heights of up to 48 metres. It flowers from October to February and fruits in January & February. It has simple leaf compoundness as well as bacciferous and/or drupaceous fruit.

== Habitat and distribution ==
It is found in monsoonal sclerophyll forest and rainforest in the Cape York Peninsula and Torres Strait Islands of North Queensland.

== Conservation ==
Under the Nature Conservation Act 1992 it is regarded as Least Concern.
