= Litsea nemoralis =

Conservation status
- Endangered (IUCN 3.1)

Scientific classification
- Kingdom: Plantae
- Clade: Tracheophytes
- Clade: Angiosperms
- Clade: Magnoliids
- Order: Laurales
- Family: Lauraceae
- Genus: Litsea
- Species: L. nemoralis

Binomial name
- Litsea nemoralis (Thwaites) Hook.f.

Species of flowering plant

Litsea nemoralis is a species of plant in the family Lauraceae. It is endemic to Sri Lanka.
