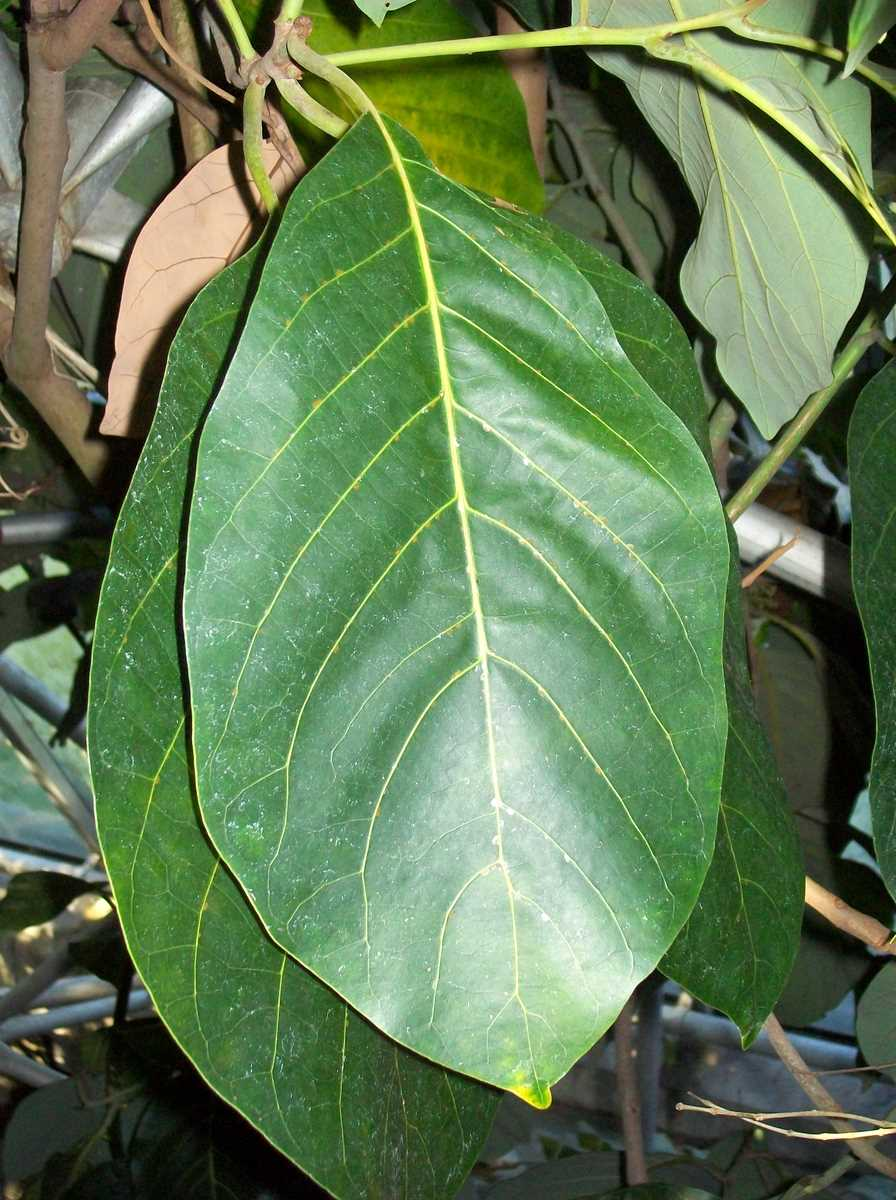
- Big-leaved Bollywood

Conservation status
- Least Concern (IUCN 3.1)

Scientific classification
- Kingdom: Plantae
- Clade: Tracheophytes
- Clade: Angiosperms
- Clade: Magnoliids
- Order: Laurales
- Family: Lauraceae
- Genus: Litsea
- Species: L. bindoniana

Binomial name
- Litsea bindoniana (F.Muell.) F.Muell.

Synonyms
- Cylicodaphne bindoniana F.Muell.

= Litsea bindoniana =

Species of tree

Litsea bindoniana, known as the big-leaved bollywood is a rainforest tree in the laurel family. A small to medium-sized bushy tree endemic to the rainforests of tropical Queensland, Australia. It features large leaves with attractive yellow venation, 25 cm (10 in) long by 10 cm (4 in) wide. They are dark green above, and paler and somewhat hairy below. The leaf stalks are hairy. The small (0.7 cm diameter) greenish flowers are fragrant and occur from March to May. They are followed by fruits which mature from September to October, being a black drupe. Regeneration is from fresh seed, after removing the fleshy aril around the seed.

The species was first described by Ferdinand von Mueller as Cylicodaphne bindoniana in 1865, before he reclassified and renamed it as Litsea bindoniana in 1882. It was named in honour of Victorian 19th century parliamentarian and agriculturist Samuel Henry Bindon. It is one of eleven species in the large Asian genus Litsea to reach Australia.

Litsea bindoniana is found in central and northern Queensland in forests to 1000 m (3500 ft) elevation. Its fruit are eaten by the superb fruit dove, along with many other lauraceae. It is also a food plant for the blue triangle (Graphium sarpedon) and bronze flat (Netrocoryne repanda). The leaves are used by the tooth-billed catbird (Scenopoeetes dentirostris) to decorate its display court.

Litsea bindoniana is suited as a garden plant in tropical situations. Young plants need protection from winds, as well as plenty of shade and moisture.
