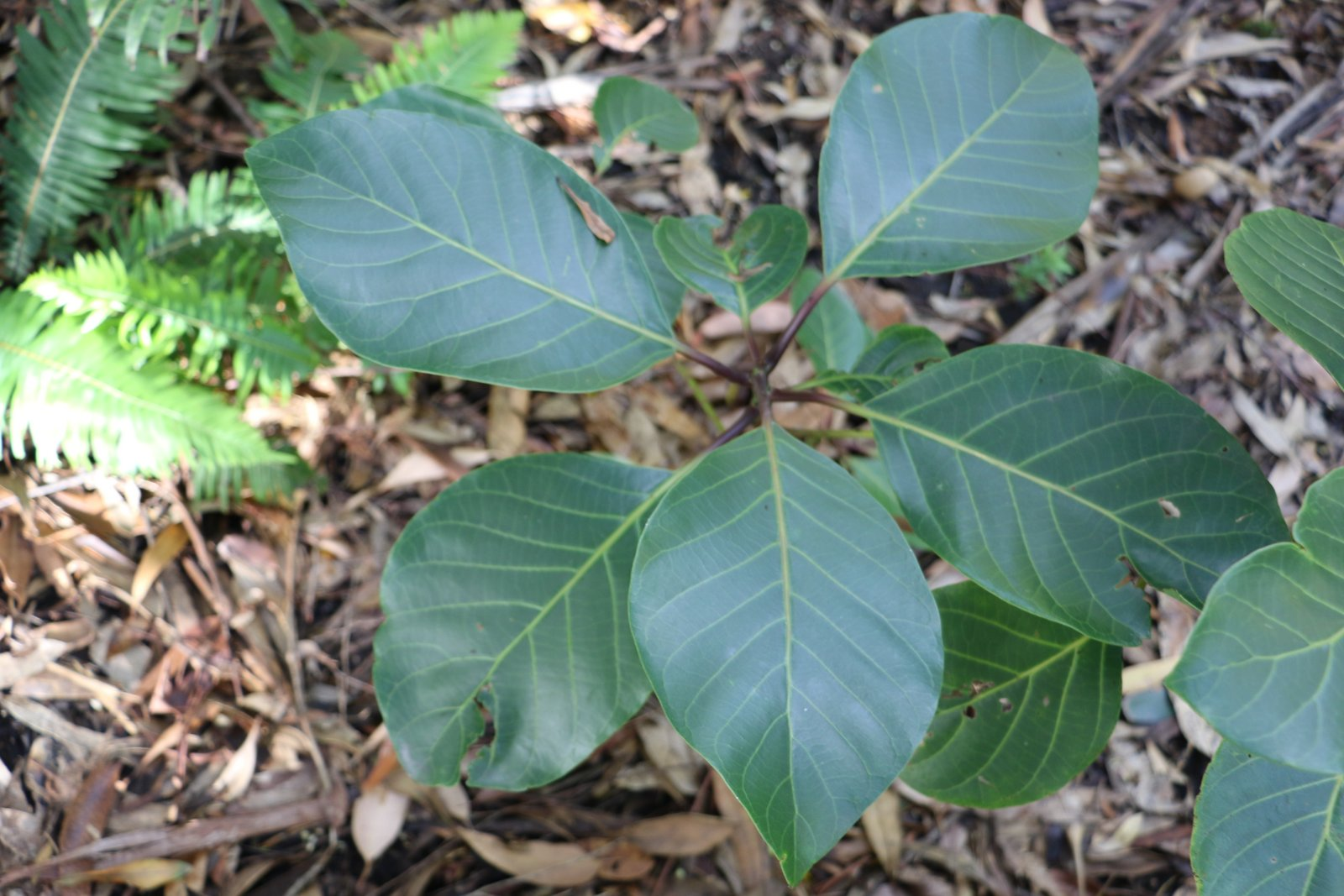

Scientific classification
- Kingdom: Plantae
- Clade: Embryophytes
- Clade: Tracheophytes
- Clade: Spermatophytes
- Clade: Angiosperms
- Clade: Magnoliids
- Order: Laurales
- Family: Lauraceae
- Genus: Litsea
- Species: L. granitica

Binomial name
- Litsea granitica B.Hyland

= Litsea granitica =

Bollygum

Species of tree

Litsea granitica, the bollygum, is a species of tree in the laurel family, found in tropical Queensland, Australia. The habitat is mountain rainforest on soils derived from granite.
