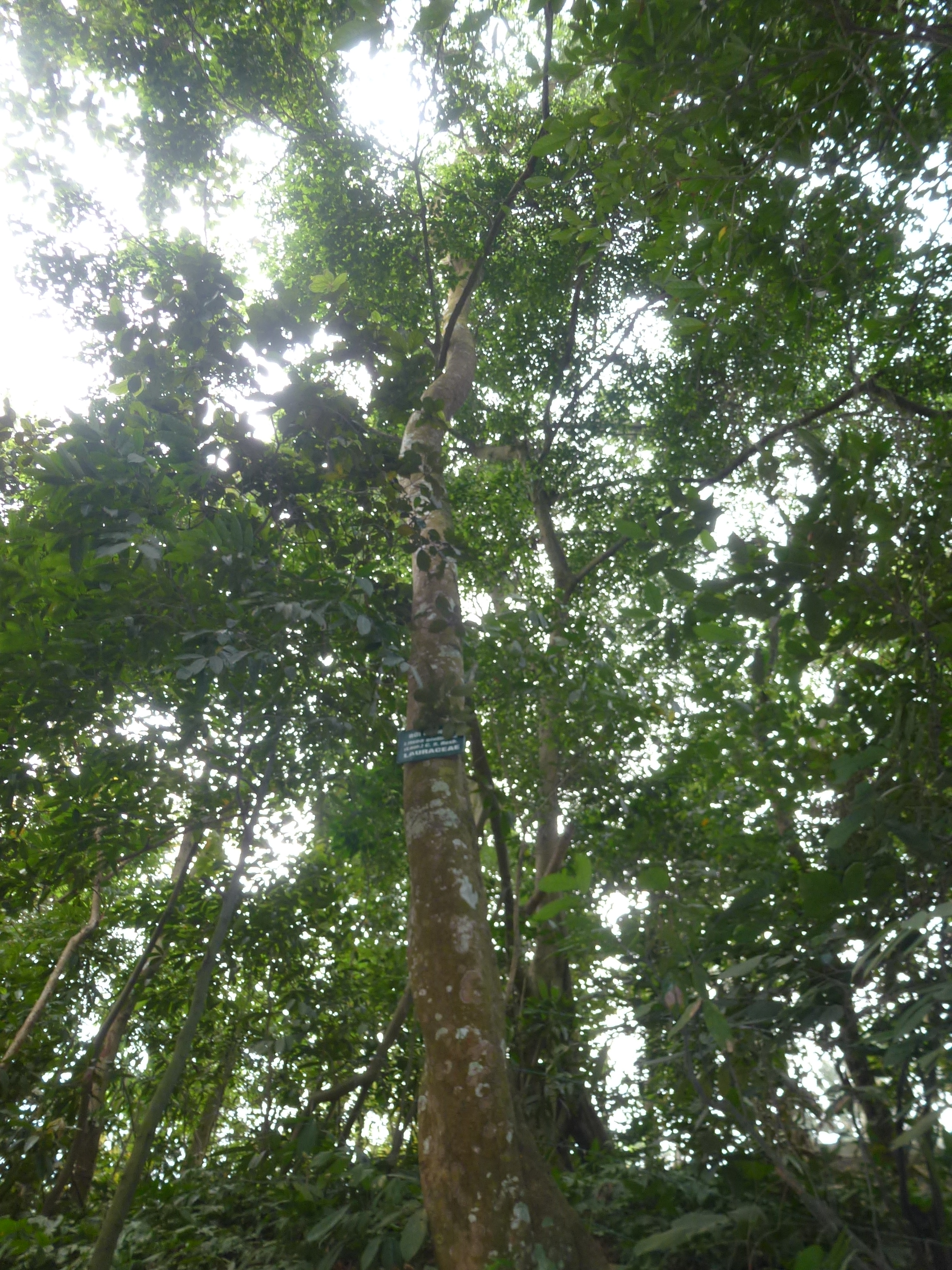
- Litsea glutinosa in Vietnam

Conservation status
- Least Concern (IUCN 3.1)

Scientific classification
- Kingdom: Plantae
- Clade: Tracheophytes
- Clade: Angiosperms
- Clade: Magnoliids
- Order: Laurales
- Family: Lauraceae
- Genus: Litsea
- Species: L. glutinosa

Binomial name
- Litsea glutinosa (Lour.) C.B.Rob.

Synonyms
- 71 synonyms: Cylicodaphne sebifera Blume; Litsea sebifera Pers.; Sebifera glutinosa Lour.; Tetranthera sebifera F.Dietr.; Tomex sebifera Willd.; Actinodaphne chinensis (Lam.) Nees; Decapenta involucrata Raf.; Dodecadenia robusta Zoll. & Moritzi; Iozoste chinensis (Lam.) Blume; Laurus crucifolia Noronha; Laurus involucrata J.Koenig ex Retz.; Lepidadenia wightiana Nees; Litsea apetala (Roxb.) Pers.; Litsea baracatanensis Elmer; Litsea brideliifolia Hayata; Litsea chinensis Lam.; Litsea citrifolia Juss.; Litsea fruticosa Span. ex Blume; Litsea geminata Blume; Litsea glabraria Juss.; Litsea glutinosa var. brachyphylla (Hand.-Mazz.) L.C.Wang; Litsea glutinosa var. brideliifolia (Hayata) Merr.; Litsea glutinosa var. glabraria (Juss.) Mudgal & K.K.Khanna; Litsea glutinosa var. littoralis Koord. & Valeton; Litsea glutinosa var. longifolia (Haines) K.K.Khanna; Litsea glutinosa var. normalis (Haines) K.K.Khanna; Litsea glutinosa var. platyphylla (Pers.) Hochr.; Litsea involucrata (J.Koenig ex Retz.) Hereman; Litsea involucrata var. fernandezii M.R.Almeida & S.M.Almeida; Litsea laevis Juss.; Litsea laurifolia (Jacq.) F.M.Bailey; Litsea laurifolia var. roxburghii (Nees) Cordem.; Litsea ligustrina Trimen; Litsea multiflora Blume; Litsea platyphylla Pers.; Litsea sebifera var. brachyphylla Hand.-Mazz.; Litsea sebifera var. glabraria Hook.f.; Litsea sebifera var. longifolia Haines; Litsea sebifera var. normalis Haines; Litsea undulata Zipp. ex Blume; Litsea wightiana (Nees) Benth. & Hook.f. ex B.D.Jacks.; Malapoenna macrantha Kuntze; Malapoenna undulata Kuntze; Pipalia solitaria Stokes; Polyadenia grandifolia Miq.; Sebifera glutinosa Blanco; Tetradenia brideliifolia (Hayata) Makino & Nemoto; Tetranthera apetala Roxb.; Tetranthera capitata Roxb. ex Nees; Tetranthera citrifolia Spreng.; Tetranthera daradmeda Buch.-Ham. ex Wall.; Tetranthera fruticosa Roxb.; Tetranthera geminata (Blume) Nees; Tetranthera glabraria F.Dietr.; Tetranthera hispidula Zipp. ex Blume; Tetranthera laurifolia Jacq.; Tetranthera laurifolia var. attenuata Blume; Tetranthera laurifolia var. multiflora Blume; Tetranthera laurifolia var. roxburghii (Nees) Blume; Tetranthera litoralis Blume; Tetranthera macrantha Wall.; Tetranthera multiflora (Blume) Nees; Tetranthera panshia Buch.-Ham. ex Wall.; Tetranthera platyphylla (Pers.) F.Dietr.; Tetranthera polycephala Wall. ex Meisn.; Tetranthera roxburghii Nees; Tetranthera salicifolia Zoll. ex Meisn.; Tomex tetranthera Willd.; Glabraria litoralis Miq.; Bischofia cumingiana Decne.; Camellia integrifolia Choisy

= Litsea glutinosa =

Species of tree

Litsea glutinosa is a rainforest tree in the laurel family, Lauraceae. Common names include soft bollygum, bolly beech, Bollywood, bollygum, brown bollygum, brown Bollywood, sycamore and brown beech.

The powdered bark, known as jigat, may be used as an adhesive paste in incense stick production.

== Distribution ==
This species is native to the following regions/countries:

- China: China South-Central, China Southeast, Hainan
- Indian Subcontinent, Assam, Bangladesh, East Himalaya, India, Nepal, Sri Lanka, West Himalaya
- Indo-China: Andaman Is., Cambodia, Laos, Myanmar, Nicobar Is., Thailand, Vietnam
- Malesia: Borneo, Jawa, Lesser Sunda Is., Malaya, Maluku, Philippines, Sulawesi
- Papuasia: New Guinea, Solomon Is.
- Australia: Northern Territory, Queensland, Western Australia

It had been introduced to Réunion, Mauritius and Mayotte.
