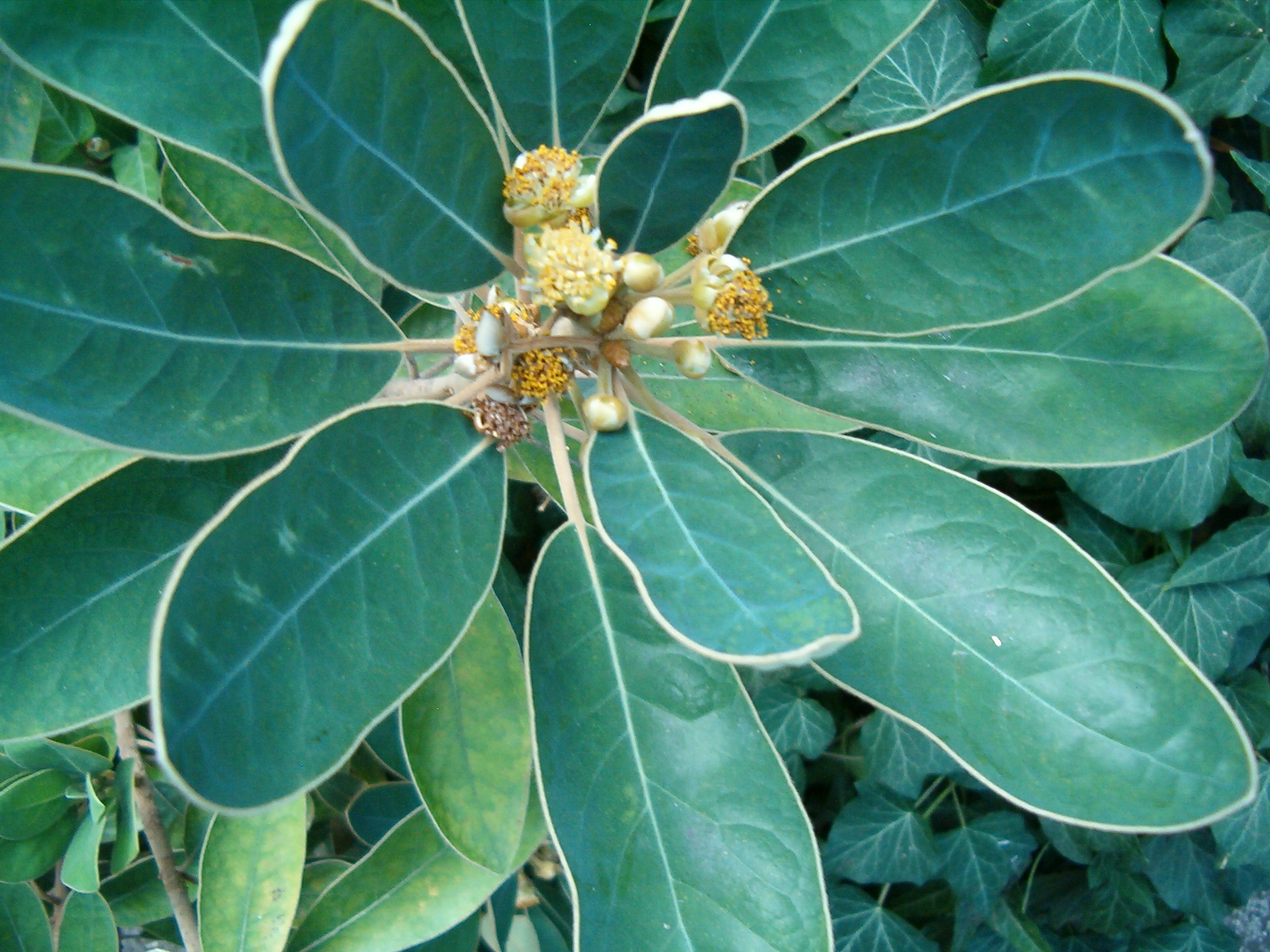
- Litsea japonica

Scientific classification
- Kingdom: Plantae
- Clade: Tracheophytes
- Clade: Angiosperms
- Clade: Magnoliids
- Order: Laurales
- Family: Lauraceae
- Genus: Litsea; Lam.

Species
- See text

Synonyms
- List: Adenodaphne S.Moore; Bistania Noronha; Cubeba Raf.; Cylicodaphne Nees; Darwinia Dennst.; Decapenta Raf.; Dipliathus Raf.; Fiwa J.F.Gmel.; Heckeria Raf.; Hexanthus Lour.; Iozoste Nees; Iteadaphne Blume; Lepidadenia Nees; Malapoenna Adans.; Pipalia Stokes; Pseudolitsea Y.C.Yang; Quinquedula Noronha; Sebifera Lour.; Tetranthera Jacq.; Tomex Thunb.

= Litsea =

Genus of flowering plants

Litsea is a genus of evergreen or deciduous trees or shrubs belonging to the laurel family, Lauraceae. The genus includes a large number of accepted species in tropical and subtropical areas of Asia, Australasia, the western Pacific, and North and Central America.

== Characteristics ==
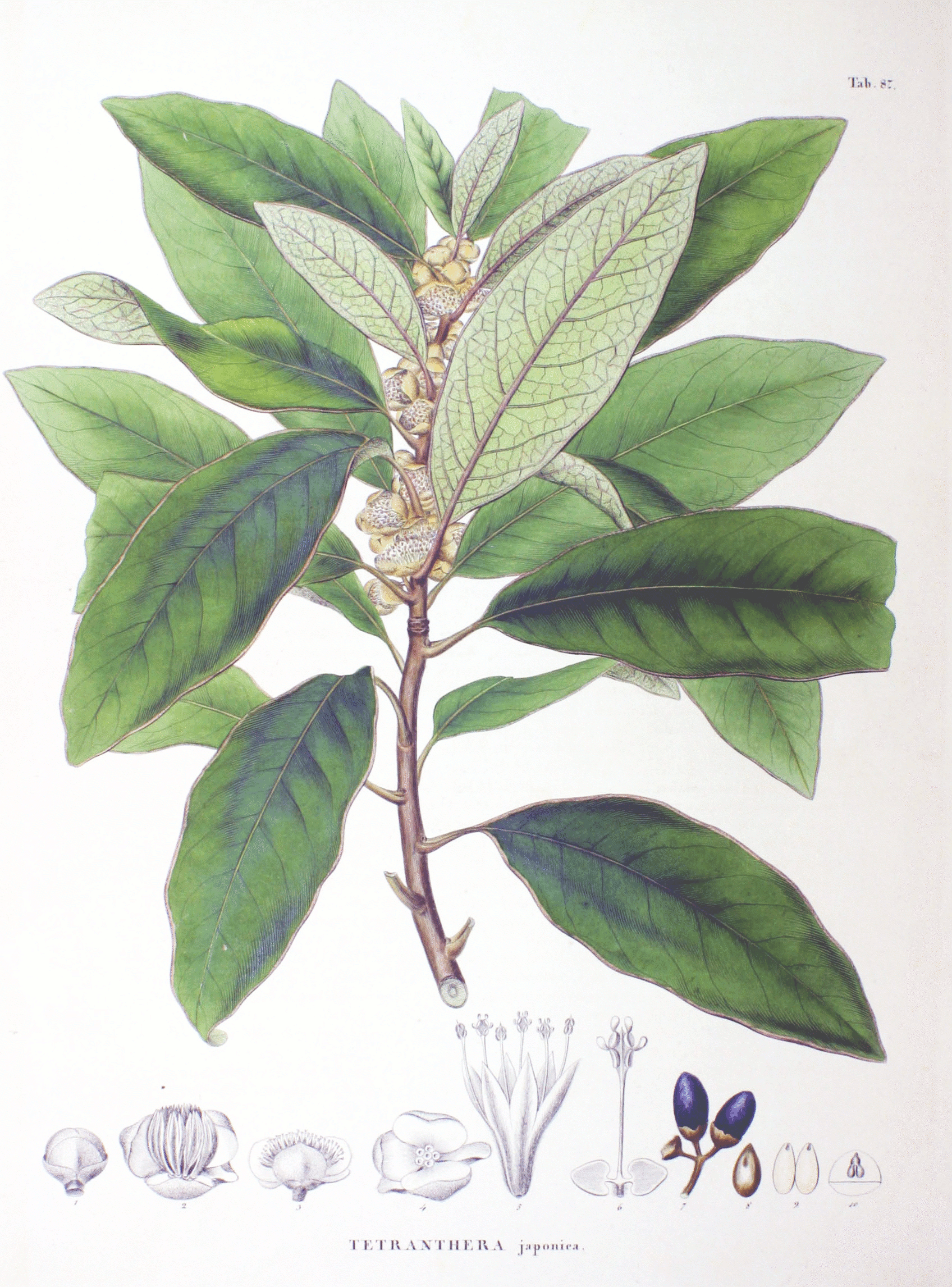
Litsea japonica

They are typically dioecious trees or shrubs. The leaves can be either deciduous or evergreen depending on species, and aromatic. They have leaves alternate or opposite or in whorls. The inconspicuous flowers range from greenish to white, greenish-yellow, to yellowish. The inflorescences are pseudo-umbels, flat-topped or rounded flower clusters, each pseudo-umbel with an involucre of four or six decussate bracts.

== Selected species ==
- Litsea auriculata S.S.Chien & W.C.Cheng
- Litsea australis B.Hyland
- Litsea bindoniana (F.Muell.) F.Muell.
- Litsea calicaris Kirk
- Litsea claviflora Gamble
- Litsea cubeba (Lour.) Pers.
- Litsea curtisii Gamble
- Litsea dilleniifolia P.Y.Pai & P.H.Huang
- Litsea garciae S.Vidal
- Litsea gardneri (Thwaites) Meisn.
- Litsea glaberrima (Thwaites) Trimen
- Litsea glaucescens Kunth
- Litsea glutinosa (Lour.) C.B.Rob.
- Litsea granitica B.Hyland
- Litsea hirsutissima Gamble
- Litsea imbricata Guillaumin
- Litsea iteodaphne (Nees) Hook.f.
- Litsea kakkachensis R.Ganesan
- Litsea leefeana (F.Muell.) Merr.
- Litsea leiantha (Kurz) Hook.f.
- Litsea leytensis Merr.
- Litsea ligustrina (Nees) Fern.-Vill.
- Litsea monopetala (Roxb.) Pers.
- Litsea nemoralis (Thwaites) Trimen
- Litsea nigrescens Gamble
- Litsea ovalifolia (Wight) Trimen
- Litsea penangiana Hook.f.
- Litsea reticulata (Meisn.) Benth. & Hook.f. ex F.Muell.
- Litsea travancorica Gamble
- Litsea umbellata (Lour.) Merr.
- Litsea wightiana (Nees) Wall. ex Hook.f.
