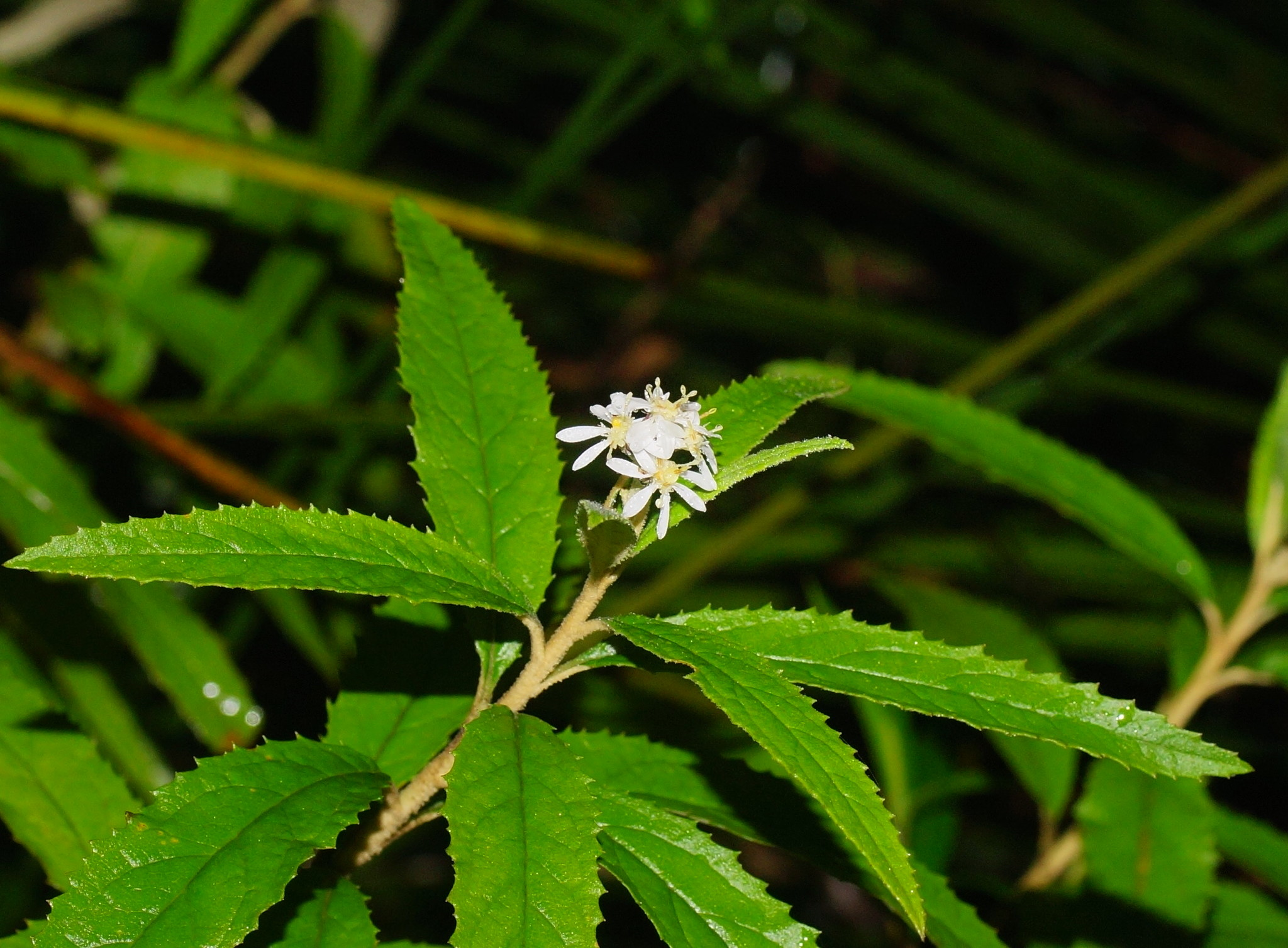
- Near Springbrook, Queensland

Scientific classification
- Kingdom: Plantae
- Clade: Tracheophytes
- Clade: Angiosperms
- Clade: Eudicots
- Clade: Asterids
- Order: Asterales
- Family: Asteraceae
- Genus: Olearia
- Species: O. heterocarpa

Binomial name
- Olearia heterocarpa S.T.Blake

= Olearia heterocarpa =

Species of plant

Olearia heterocarpa, commonly known as Nightcap daisy bush, is a species of flowering plant in the family Asteraceae and is endemic to eastern Australia. It is a shrub with narrowly elliptic or lance-shaped leaves with toothed edges, and white and yellow, daisy-like inflorescences.

== Description ==
Olearia heterocarpa is a shrub that typically grows to a height of up to 5 metres (16 feet). Its leaves are arranged alternately along the branchlets, narrowly elliptic to lance-shaped, 20–110 mm (0.79–4.33 in) long and 4–18 mm (0.16–0.71 in) wide on a petiole 3–8 mm (0.12–0.31 in) long and with toothed edges. The upper surface of the leaves is glabrous, the lower surface covered with grey or yellowish, star-shaped hairs. The heads or daisy-like "flowers" are arranged on the ends of branches in leafy corymbs 10–16 mm (0.39–0.63 in) in diameter on a peduncle up to 5 mm (0.20 in) long. Each head has four to seven white ray florets surrounding three to five yellow disc florets. Flowering occurs from May to September and the fruit is an achene, the pappus with 17 to 21 bristles.

== Taxonomy ==
Olearia heterocarpa was first formally described in 1963 by Stanley Thatcher Blake in Proceedings of the Royal Society of Queensland from specimens he collected in Lamington National Park. The specific epithet (heterocarpa) means "different-fruited".

== Distribution and habitat ==
Olearia heterocarpa grows in forest and woodland from south-eastern Queensland to the Whian Whian area far north-eastern in New South Wales.

== Conservation status ==
This olearia is listed as "near threatened" under the Queensland Government Nature Conservation Act 1992.
