= Chlorohyla callista =

Conservation status
- Least Concern (IUCN 3.1)

Scientific classification
- Kingdom: Animalia
- Phylum: Chordata
- Class: Amphibia
- Order: Anura
- Family: Pelodryadidae
- Genus: Chlorohyla
- Species: C. callista

Binomial name
- Chlorohyla callista (Kraus, 2013)

Synonyms
- Litoria callista Kraus, 2013; Dryopsophus callista (Kraus, 2013); Ranoidea callista (Kraus, 2013)

Species of frog

Chlorohyla callista is a species of tree frog in the family Pelodryadidae, endemic to Papua New Guinea. It has been observed on Mount Trafalgar, about 220 meters above sea level.

The author of the first formal description of Chlorohyla callista, Fred Kraus, placed it in the same species group as Litoria gracilenta but noted its different coloration, different call, and the fact that it lays eggs in streams. It is likely to also be found in many other places in New Guinea.
