= Minyon Falls =

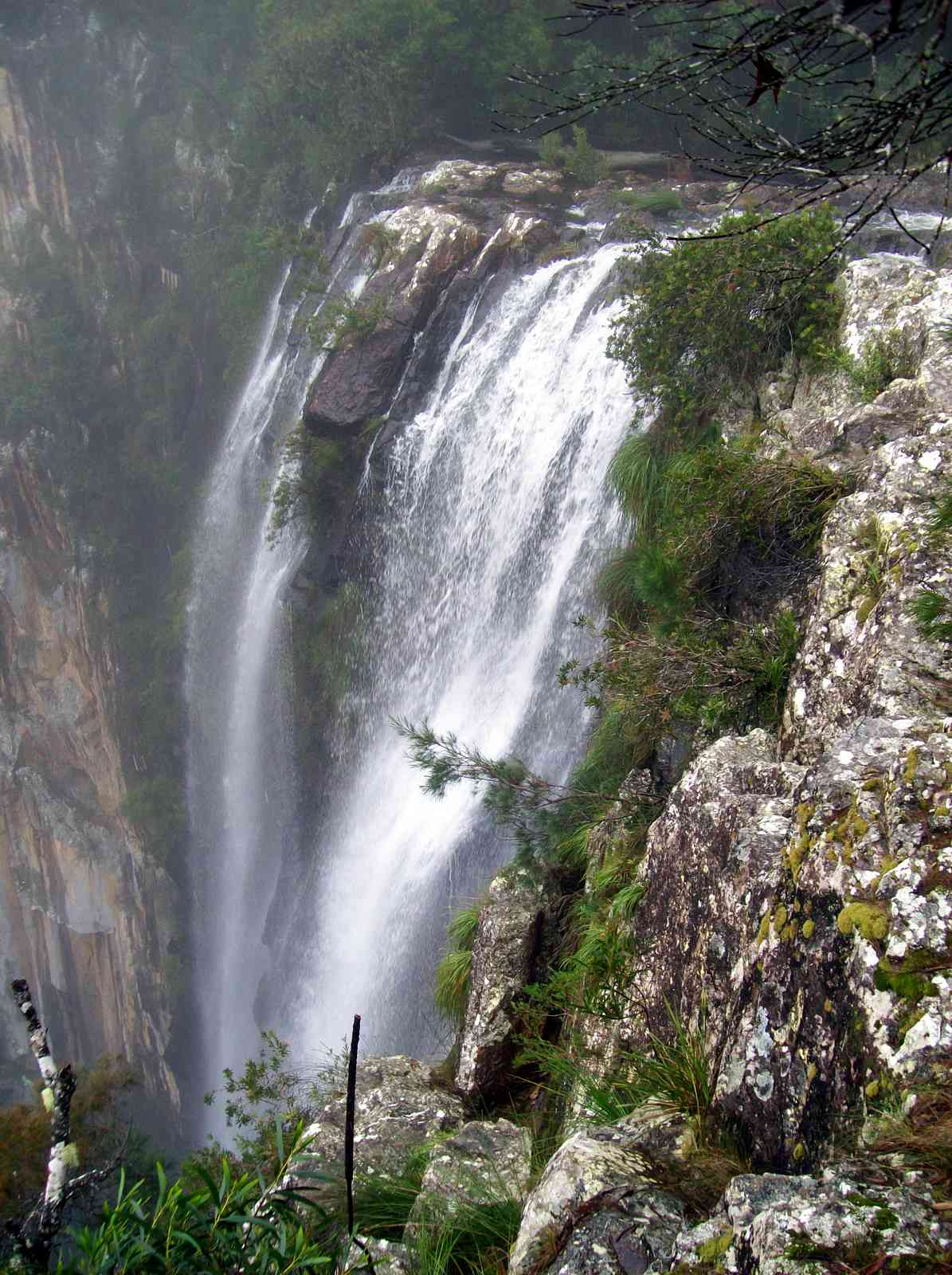
- The Minyon Falls

- Location within New South Wales
- Location: Northern Rivers, New South Wales, Australia
- Coordinates: 28°36′55″S 153°23′05″E
- Type: Plunge waterfall
- Elevation: 200 metres (660 ft) AHD
- Total height: 100 metres (330 ft)
- Watercourse: Repentance Creek

The Minyon Falls is a plunge waterfall on Repentance Creek in the Northern Rivers region of New South Wales, Australia. The waterfall descends more than 100 metres (330 ft) over the huge rhyolite cliffs which were once part of the Tweed Volcano. The water flow eroded the rocks to create the waterfall.

Minyon Falls is located in the traditional lands of the Bundjalung people.

== Origin of place name ==
There are two main theories surrounding the naming of Minyon Falls with some believing it came to be known by this name after the Bundjalung people living there began calling it Minnong, using the Bundjalung language word for 'crazy fella', because of the presence of a cedar getter living there named John McGragor. However, a more likely theory is that it is named after the Bundjalung word Minyung, which means 'what' or 'something' or the mishearing of a different Bundjalung word which was thought to mean 'high and lofty'.

== Location and features ==
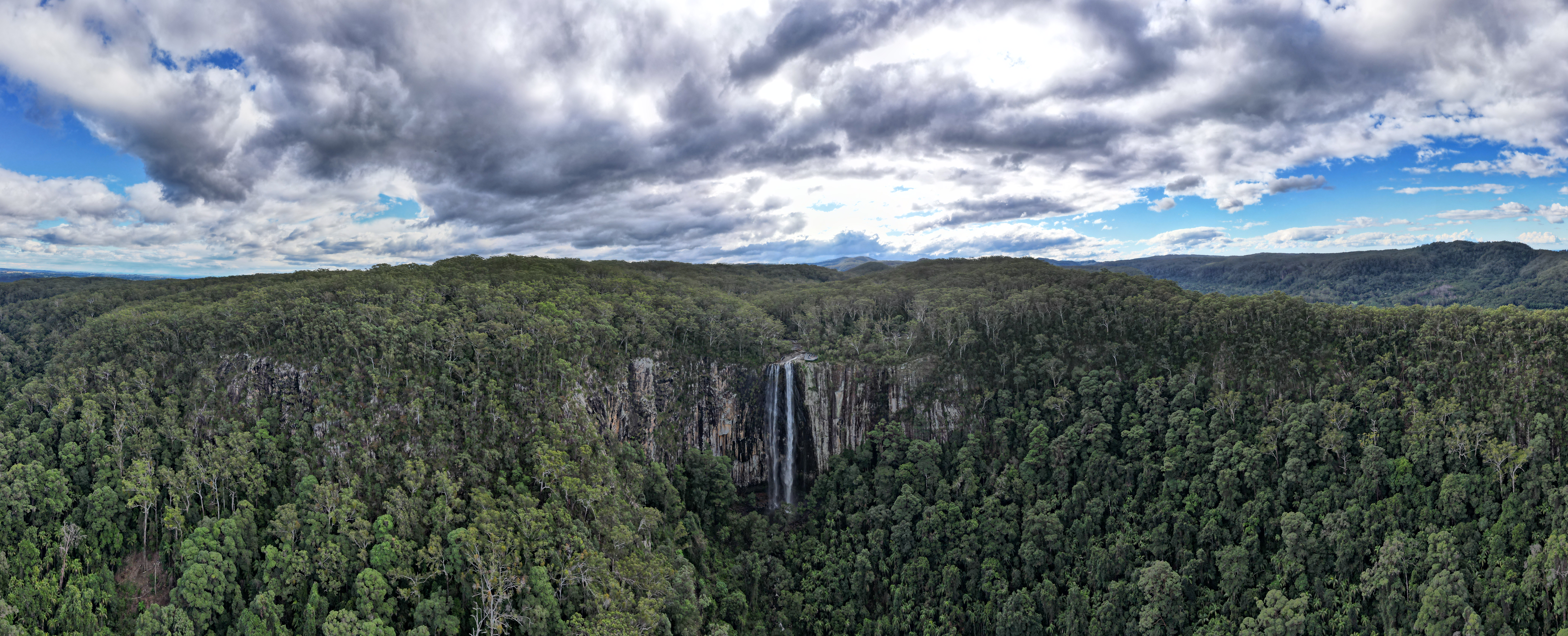
Minyon Falls panorama June 2025

The waterfall is a popular visitor attraction and is located within easy reach of the nearby town of Byron Bay in the Nightcap National Park, which was added to the Gondwana Rainforests of Australia World Heritage Site in 1986.

The National Parks and Wildlife Service manages the area as part of the Nightcap National Park, and provides facilities for visitors, including a 50 metres (160 feet) boardwalk to the lookout which is wheelchair accessible, several picnic tables and barbecue facilities at the top of the falls. The National Parks and Wildlife Service do not permit camping in the Minyon Falls area, but a camping ground is provided 2 kilometres (1.2 mi) west of the falls at Rummery Park. Visitors are able to explore the bottom of the falls and the sub-tropical rainforest along designated walking trails, all of which involve steep hills, with some scrambling over wet rocks at the base of the falls. One trail follows a route 4.5 kilometres (2.8 mi) from the top of the falls, across the ridge, near Quandong Falls, down into the valley to the bottom of the Minyon falls, it continues 2.5 kilometres (1.6 mi) to Minyon Grass, then joins the road for 1.2 kilometres (0.75 mi) back to the falls car park to form a loop. A shorter, 2.5 kilometres (1.6 mi) track runs from Minyon Grass to the bottom of the falls. Another walking trail in the area is the Boggy Creek Walk from the Rummery Park Campground to the top of the Falls (45 minutes each way).

=== Flora and fauna ===
The top of the falls is surrounded by wet sclerophyll forest with some very tall blackbutt, tallowwood and flooded gum trees. Visitors to the falls regularly observe wildlife such as lace monitor (goanna), kookaburra, satin bowerbird, noisy pitta, eastern yellow robin, pale yellow robin, scrub wren, peregrine falcon, bobuck possum, northern and long-nosed bandicoot, tawny frogmouth, stony creek frog, red-eyed green tree frog, eastern whipbird, wonga pigeon, white-headed pigeon, yellow tailed black cockatoo, little shrike-thrush, tree-creeper, carpet python, and green tree snake. There are also occasional alberts lyrebird, koala and pademelon sightings. In wet weather conditions, visitors may be encounter leeches.

The Minyon valley is a sub-tropical rainforest, vegetation includes: Bangalow palm, brushbox, strangler fig, stream lily, walking stick palm, rusty rose walnut, blue quandong, broad leaved palm lily, tree fern, red lilly pilly, white bark, birds nest fern, stag horn fern, brushbox orchid and native wisteria vine.

=== Access ===
Minyon Falls' proximity to towns such as Byron Bay, Ballina and Lismore make it a popular attraction, and the falls can be reached by car in approximately 45 minutes (1 hour from Ballina or Lismore). The falls can also be visited from the Gold Coast, which is a 2-hour journey via the Pacific Highway. The road to the falls is an unsealed road and can be difficult at times to drive.

Various local tour companies offer trips to the Minyon Falls.

=== Water Flow ===
Repentance Creek (used to be called Boggy Creek) is the water that feeds the falls. Most of the time there is water on the waterfall, but the amount of water can vary. During drier times, the waterfall dries up and the plunge pool at the bottom becomes un-swimmable.

== See also ==
- List of waterfalls
- List of waterfalls of Australia
