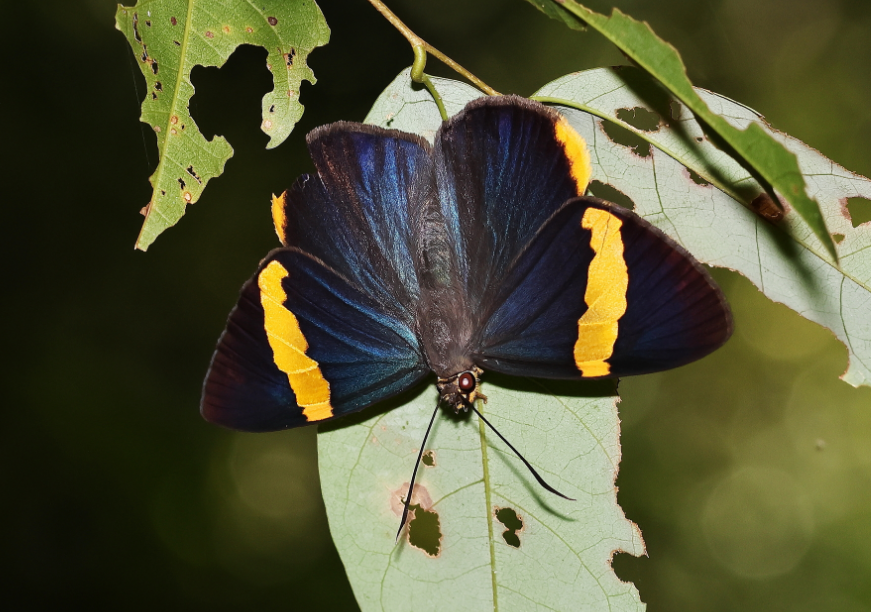

Scientific classification
- Domain: Eukaryota
- Kingdom: Animalia
- Phylum: Arthropoda
- Class: Insecta
- Order: Lepidoptera
- Family: Hesperiidae
- Genus: Chaetocneme
- Species: C. porphyropis

Binomial name
- Chaetocneme porphyropis (Meyrick & Lower, 1902)

Synonyms
- Phoenicops porphyropis Meyrick & Lower, 1902; Hesperia porphyrescens (Meyrick & Lower, 1902)

= Chaetocneme porphyropis =

Species of butterfly

Chaetocneme porphyropis, the purple brown-eye or purple dusk-flat, is a species of butterfly of the family Hesperiidae endemic to tropical Queensland, between Innisfail and Daintree on the Atherton Tableland. Its wingspan is about 60 mm. The larvae feed on various Lauraceae species, including Cinnamomum camphora, Cryptocarya grandis, Endiandra compressa, Litsea leefeana, and Neolitsea dealbata.
