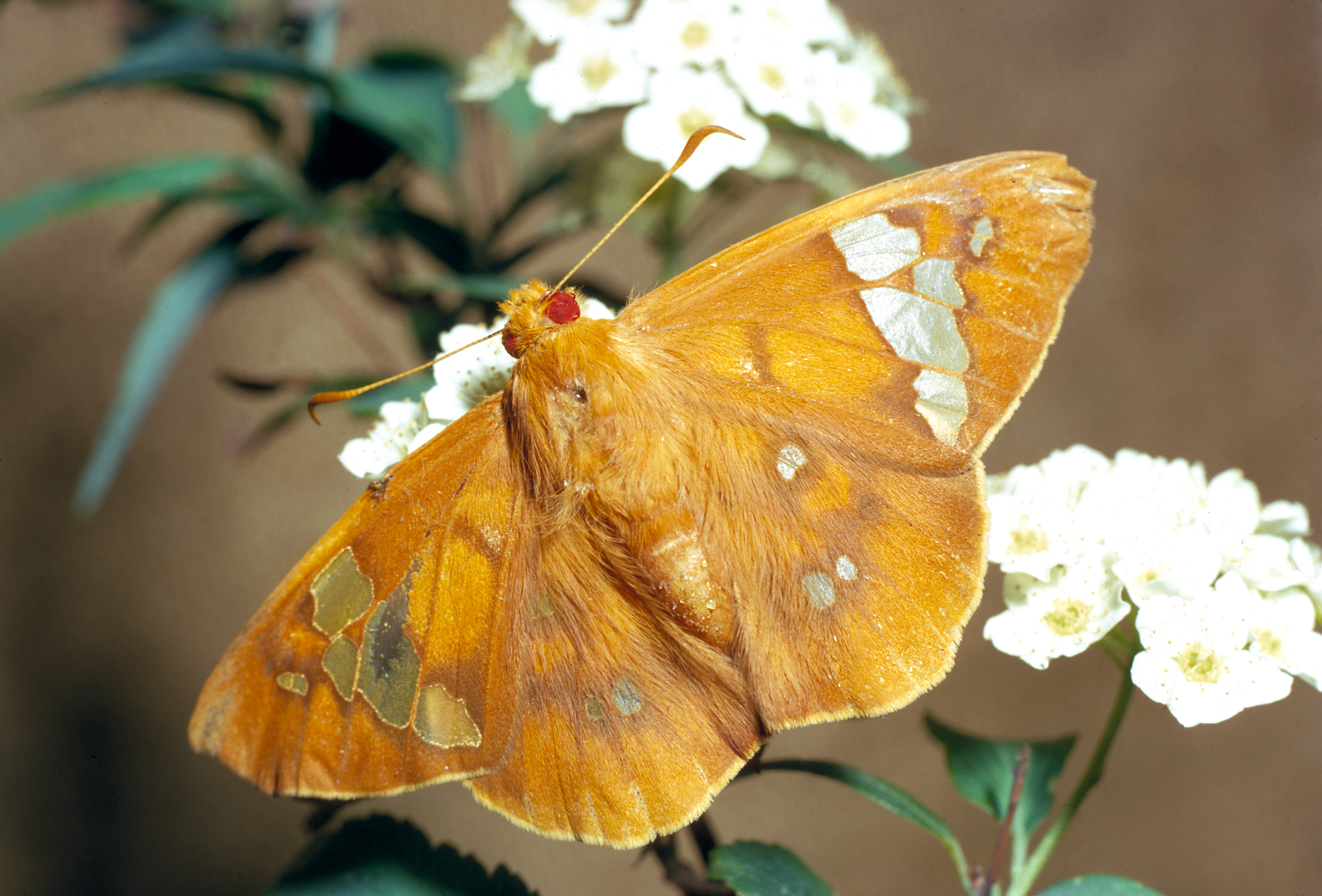

Scientific classification
- Kingdom: Animalia
- Phylum: Arthropoda
- Class: Insecta
- Order: Lepidoptera
- Family: Hesperiidae
- Genus: Chaetocneme
- Species: C. beata

Binomial name
- Chaetocneme beata (Hewitson, 1867)

Synonyms
- Netrocoryne beata Hewitson, 1867

= Chaetocneme beata =

Species of butterfly

Chaetocneme beata, also known as the common red-eye, (Note: or common red-eye flat; variations using redeye are also used.) eastern dull-flat or eastern dusk-flat, is a species of butterfly in the family Hesperiidae. It is found in Australia on the edges of the upland rainforest along the coast of Queensland and New South Wales.

The wingspan is about 50 mm.

The larvae feed on various trees, including Annona reticulata, Croton insularis, Eupomatia laurina, Cinnamomum camphora, Hibiscus rosa-sinensis and Lophostemon confertus.
