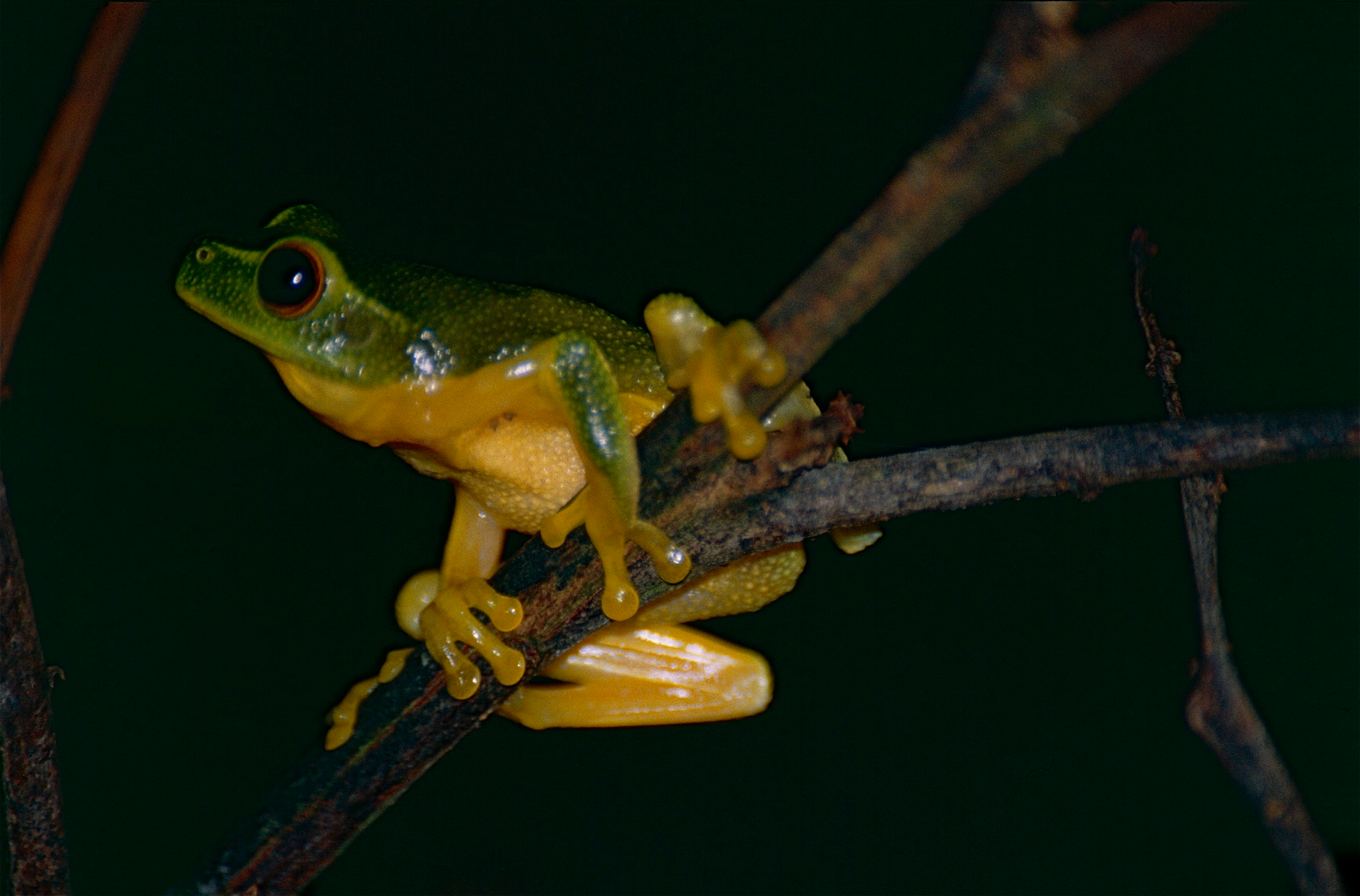
- Chlorohyla gracilenta

Conservation status
- Least Concern (IUCN 3.1)

Scientific classification
- Kingdom: Animalia
- Phylum: Chordata
- Class: Amphibia
- Order: Anura
- Family: Pelodryadidae
- Genus: Chlorohyla
- Species: C. gracilenta

Binomial name
- Chlorohyla gracilenta (Peters, 1869)
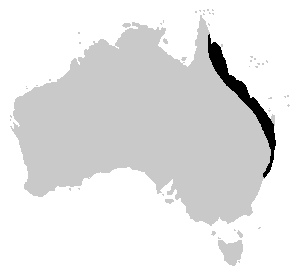
- Distribution of the dainty green tree frog

= Dainty green tree frog =

Species of amphibian

The dainty green tree frog (Chlorohyla gracilenta), also known as the graceful tree frog, is a species of tree frog in the family Pelodryadidae. It is native to eastern Queensland, and north-eastern New South Wales, Australia and ranges from northern Cape York in Queensland to Gosford in New South Wales, with a small and most likely introduced population in Hornsby Heights in Sydney. It is one of two faunal emblems of the City of Brisbane.

== Description ==
The dainty green tree frog is a slender, medium-sized frog, reaching a length of 45 millimetres (1.8 in). It is a rich green on its dorsal surface, with a yellow ventral surface. It has a coarse, granular skin with bright orange eyes; some specimens have a light blue ring following the circumference of the eye. The posterior of the thigh is purple-brown or maroon and the tympanum is visible. In most specimens, a thin yellow or white line runs from its nostril to its eye, and this distinguishes it from the closely related red-eyed tree frog (C. chloris) and orange-thighed frog (C. xanthomera), which both lack this line. If this feature is lacking, the granularity of the dorsal surface and size (C. gracilenta is smaller) will separate it from both C. chloris and C. xanthomera.

The fingers of C. gracilenta are three-quarters webbed, while the toes are fully webbed.

== Ecology and behaviour ==
The dainty green tree frog is commonly found in vegetation emerging from the water in streams and swamps, often in temporary water. It is found in a range of habitats, including rainforest, woodland and forest. It is commonly found near human developments, in gardens or farms and often enters houses looking for insects. Due to its common occurrence on fruit and vegetable farms, particularly bananas, it is commonly transported around Australia with fruits or vegetables, frequently becoming a lost frog. This is common among many frog species, and is of concern due to the much faster rate at which it can spread disease.

This species is usually seen after heavy rain during spring and summer. It breeds in flooded grassland and small ponds. The males will call during summer after rain, and the call is a long "waa" or "wee". Others describe the call as a long, growl-like 'aarrrc' repeated frequently. Males form noisy choruses during summer breeding season." The eggs are laid in a clear jelly lump in water, and are attached to vegetation. Tadpole development takes about 14 weeks. The tadpoles are a dark brown colour, with a clear, yellow tinge on the body wall.

== Captive care ==
If kept as a pet in Australia, the appropriate permit is required.
