= Lost frog =

Term used for accidentally relocated frogs

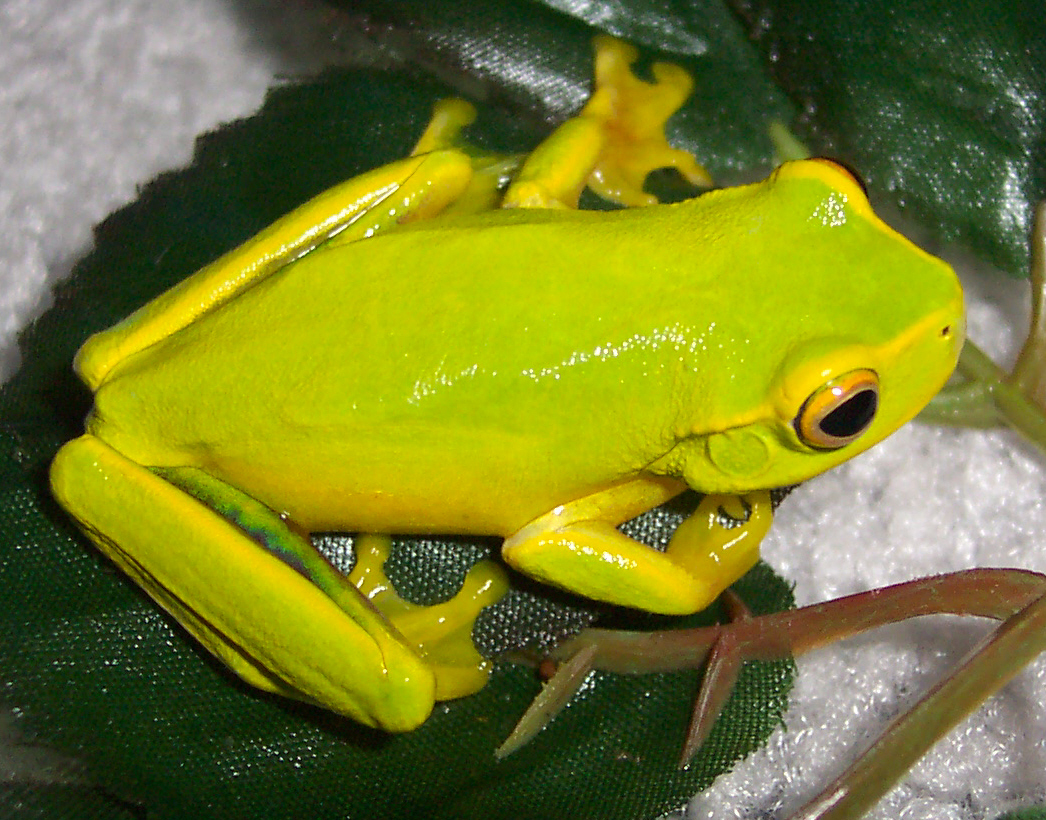
The dainty green tree frog is one of the most common lost frogs.

Lost frogs, also called translocated frogs, frogs which have been relocated, usually accidentally, outside of their original distribution.

In Australia a large number of frogs (up to 10,000 a year) transported accidentally while hiding in fruit produce, flowers and building and landscape supplies. Most of the lost frogs each year are moved from Northern Australia to the larger cities in the south.

The majority of the lost frogs turn up in fruit shops and markets. These frogs are often released into the surrounding areas. The release of lost frogs into areas far from their original habitat can have devastating effects on the released frog or the local frog populations. As lost frogs often end up moving from tropical to cooler areas they often cannot adapt fast enough to the new climate, and due to the stress of travelling hundreds of kilometres, often suffer injuries and are likely to die. Lost frogs are also often responsible for the spread of disease. When a frog suffering from a disease is released into an area where the disease is not present, it can have severe effects on the local frog populations. The fast spread of the chytrid fungus around Australia was likely to have been assisted by the introduction of lost frogs into areas where the disease was absent.

== Frog rescue ==
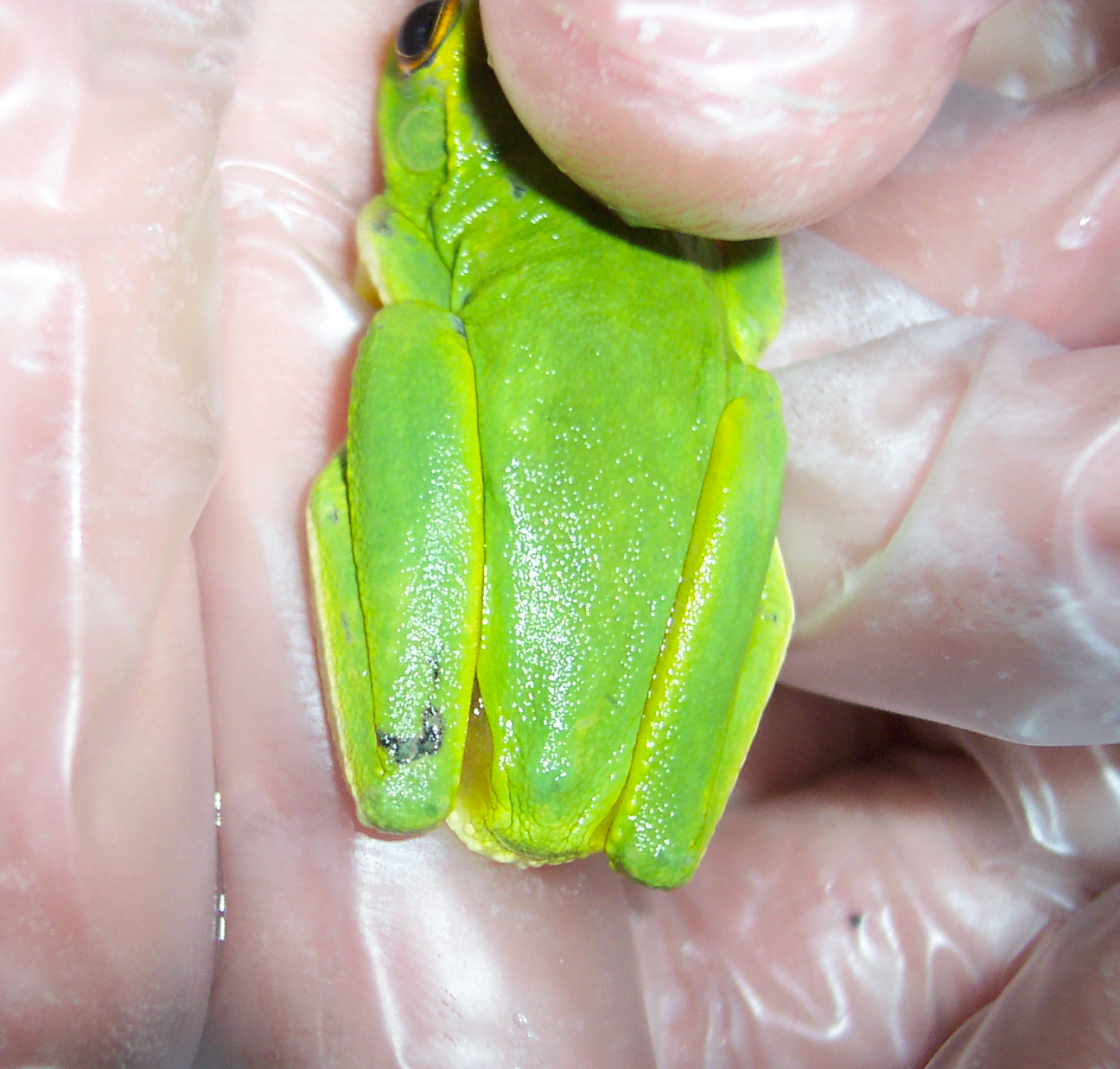
Extra care should be taken with frogs showing skin damage. They should always be handled with gloves as oils and debris on the skin are harmful to the frog.

To prevent the release of lost frogs, many groups in Australia's major cities have set up lost frog rescue services. The aim of such programs is to collect the lost frogs from fruit shops or landscaping suppliers and quarantine them for 2–3 months in order to make sure it is not a carrier of exotic diseases.

=== Quarantine ===
Quarantine is extremely important in the management of lost frogs. It involves holding the frog separate from others in an essentially bare container, with nothing more than a water dish, a hiding place and food. The frogs must be checked regularly for any evidence of disease and to monitor injury. Once the quarantine period is over the frog still cannot be released into the wild, because it is extremely difficult to track down the exact location where the frog originally came from. Most lost frogs are then sold to people willing to look after them or who want a frog as a pet. The Hygiene Protocol for Control of Disease in Frogs, should be followed when dealing with lost frogs, it was written by the National Parks and Wildlife Service and is recognized as one of the best guides for preventing the spread of the amphibian chytrid fungus.

== Lost frog species ==
The majority of lost frogs are tree frogs, as these frogs often live in banana plantations, and are moved with the bananas when they are cut down for shipping. Therefore, the majority of frogs that end up becoming lost frogs are:

- Dainty green tree frog (Litoria gracilenta)—also known as banana frogs for this exact reason
- Green tree frog (Litoria caerulea)
- Eastern dwarf tree frog (Litoria fallax)
- White lipped tree frog (Litoria infrafrenata)
- Peron's tree frog (Litoria peronii)

In building and landscaping materials ground frogs are the main species which are transported; the spotted grass frog (Limnodynastes tasmaniensis) is well known for being moved long distance in such materials. There are colonies of this species in areas far from their native range, which are thought to be the result of their accidental transportation.

Cane toads (Bufo marinus) are also known to become lost frogs, however they can usually adapt to change, and often do not die once they reach their destination. The movement of cane toads in building material is one of the causes for the spread of the species around Australia. Populations of cane toads ahead of their main frontier, such as the former population at Port Macquarie, are believed to be displaced toads moved from areas in Queensland.
