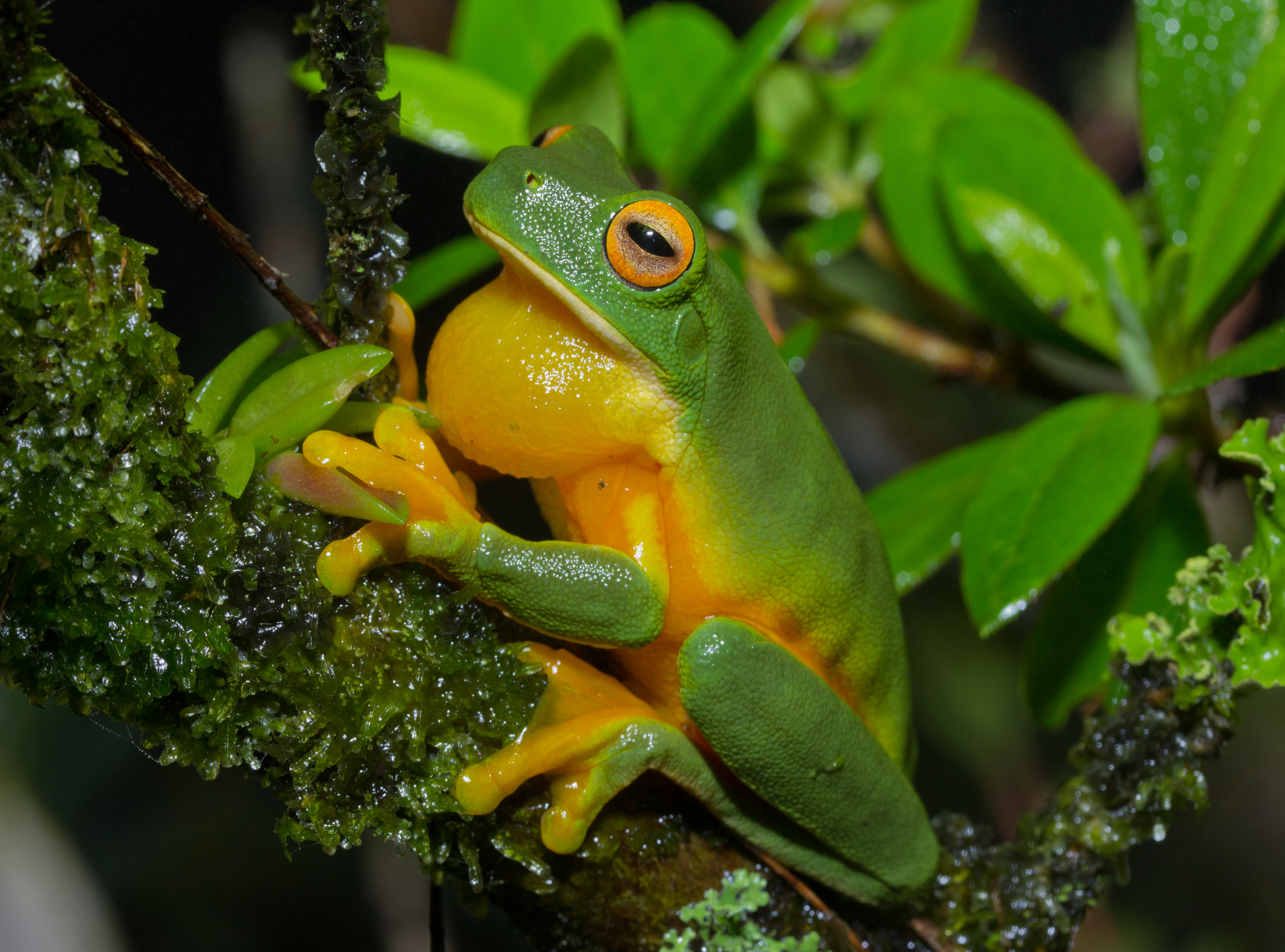
- Male orange-thighed frog, Far North Queensland, Australia

Scientific classification
- Kingdom: Animalia
- Phylum: Chordata
- Class: Amphibia
- Order: Anura
- Family: Pelodryadidae
- Subfamily: Pelodryadinae
- Genus: Chlorohyla; Mahony, Donnellan & Richards, 2025

Species
- See text

= Chlorohyla =

Genus of amphibians

Chlorohyla is a genus of arboreal frogs in the family Pelodryadidae. These frogs are native to eastern Australia, Papua and surrounding islands. Species in the genus were previously included within the wastebasket genus Litoria, but were separated into a new genus in 2025. They are small-to-medium sized frogs, all with a uniform green colour and often brightly-coloured (red or orange) eyes.

== Species ==
Common name	Binomial name
Aru tree frog	Chlorohyla aruensis (Horst, 1883)
	Chlorohyla auae (Menzies and Tyler, 2004)
	Chlorohyla bella (McDonald, Rowley, Richards, and Frankham, 2016)
	Chlorohyla callista (Kraus, 2013)
Red-eyed tree frog	Chlorohyla chloris (Boulenger, 1892)
	Chlorohyla elkeae (Günther and Richards, 2000)
	Chlorohyla eschata (Kraus and Allison, 2009)
Dainty green tree frog	Chlorohyla gracilenta (Peters, 1869)
	Chlorohyla kumae (Menzies and Tyler, 2004)
	Chlorohyla robinsonae (Oliver, Stuart-Fox, and Richards, 2008)
Wahai tree frog	Chlorohyla vagabunda (Peters and Doria, 1878)
Orange-thighed frog	Chlorohyla xanthomera (Davies, McDonald, and Adams, 1986)
