= Minyon Falls Rhyolite Member =

Geologic formation

- Stratigraphic range: ~23.03–2.58 Ma
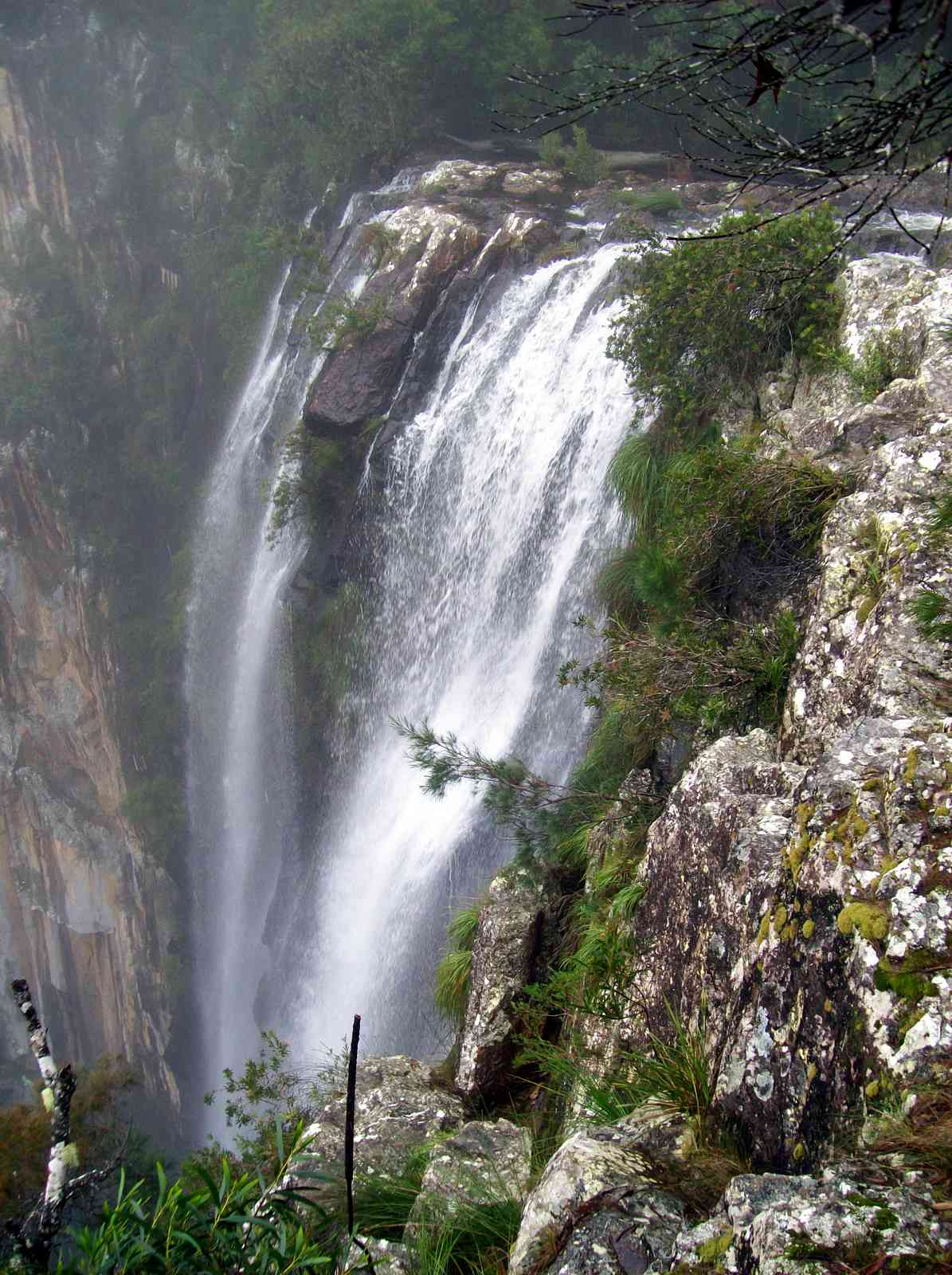
- Minyon Falls, Australia
- Type: Geological member
- Unit of: Nimbin Rhyolite
- Thickness: 500 metres (1,640 ft)

Location
- Coordinates: 28.615278°S 153.384722°E
- Region: New South Wales
- Country: Australia

Type section
- Named for: Minyon Falls
- Named by: Duggan M.B., Mason D.R.
- Location: Nightcap National Park
- Year defined: 1988

The Minyon Falls Rhyolite Member is a geologic member in the far north east of New South Wales, Australia. This formation is up to 500 metres thick. Formed from a volcanic lava flow some 20 million years ago in the Cenozoic, it is part of the Nimbin Rhyolite of the Lamington Volcanics. Constituents include porphyritic and non porphyritic rhyolite, obsidian, pitchstone, tuff, and agglomerate. It may be viewed at Minyon Falls.

== See also ==
Tweed Volcano
