= Aru tree frog =

Conservation status
- Data Deficient (IUCN 3.1)

Scientific classification
- Kingdom: Animalia
- Phylum: Chordata
- Class: Amphibia
- Order: Anura
- Family: Pelodryadidae
- Genus: Chlorohyla
- Species: C. aruensis

Binomial name
- Chlorohyla aruensis (Horst, 1883)

Synonyms
- Litoria aruensis (Horst, 1883)

Species of amphibian

The Aru tree frog (Chlorohyla aruensis) is a species of frog in the family Pelodryadidae that is endemic to Indonesia. Its natural habitats are subtropical or tropical moist lowland forests and subtropical or tropical swamps. It was originally described on Aru Islands and Misool and may only exist here; it may also exist on Papua although this is not confirmed. It is threatened by habitat destruction by logging and agriculture.
