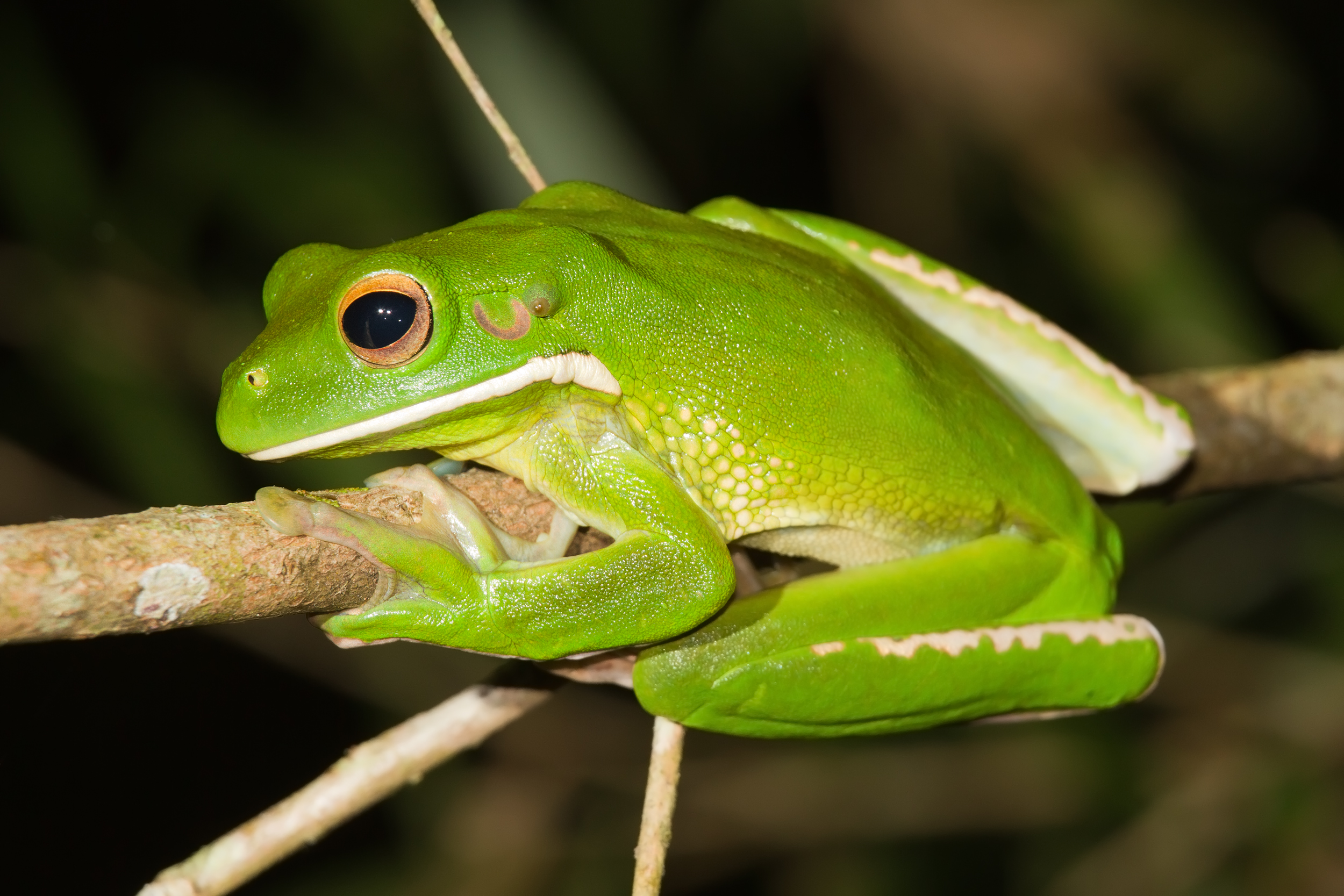

Conservation status
- Least Concern (IUCN 3.1)

Scientific classification
- Kingdom: Animalia
- Phylum: Chordata
- Class: Amphibia
- Order: Anura
- Family: Pelodryadidae
- Genus: Sandyrana
- Species: S. infrafrenata

Binomial name
- Sandyrana infrafrenata (Günther, 1867)

Synonyms
- List: Hyla infrafrenata Günther, 1867; Calamita dolichopsis Cope, 1867; Pelodryas dolichopsis Meyer, 1875; Pelodryas militarius Ramsay, 1878; Litoria guttata Macleay, 1878; Hyla dolichopsis Boulenger, 1882; Hyla infrataeniata Boulenger, 1885; Hyla spengeli Boulenger, 1912; Hyla militaria Boulenger, 1912; Hyla trinilensis Ahl, 1929; Hyla infralineata Rensch, 1936; Hyla spengleri Loveridge, 1948; Litoria infrafrenata Tyler, 1971; Sandyrana infrafrenata Wells and Wellington, 1985

= White-lipped tree frog =

Species of amphibian

The white-lipped tree frog (Sandyrana infrafrenata) is a species of frog in the family Pelodryadidae. It is the world's largest tree frog (the Cuban tree frog reaches a similar maximum size) and is found in Australia, Indonesia, Papua New Guinea, the Solomon Islands and Timor-Leste. Other common names include the New Guinea treefrog, giant tree frog, and Australian giant treefrog.

== Description ==
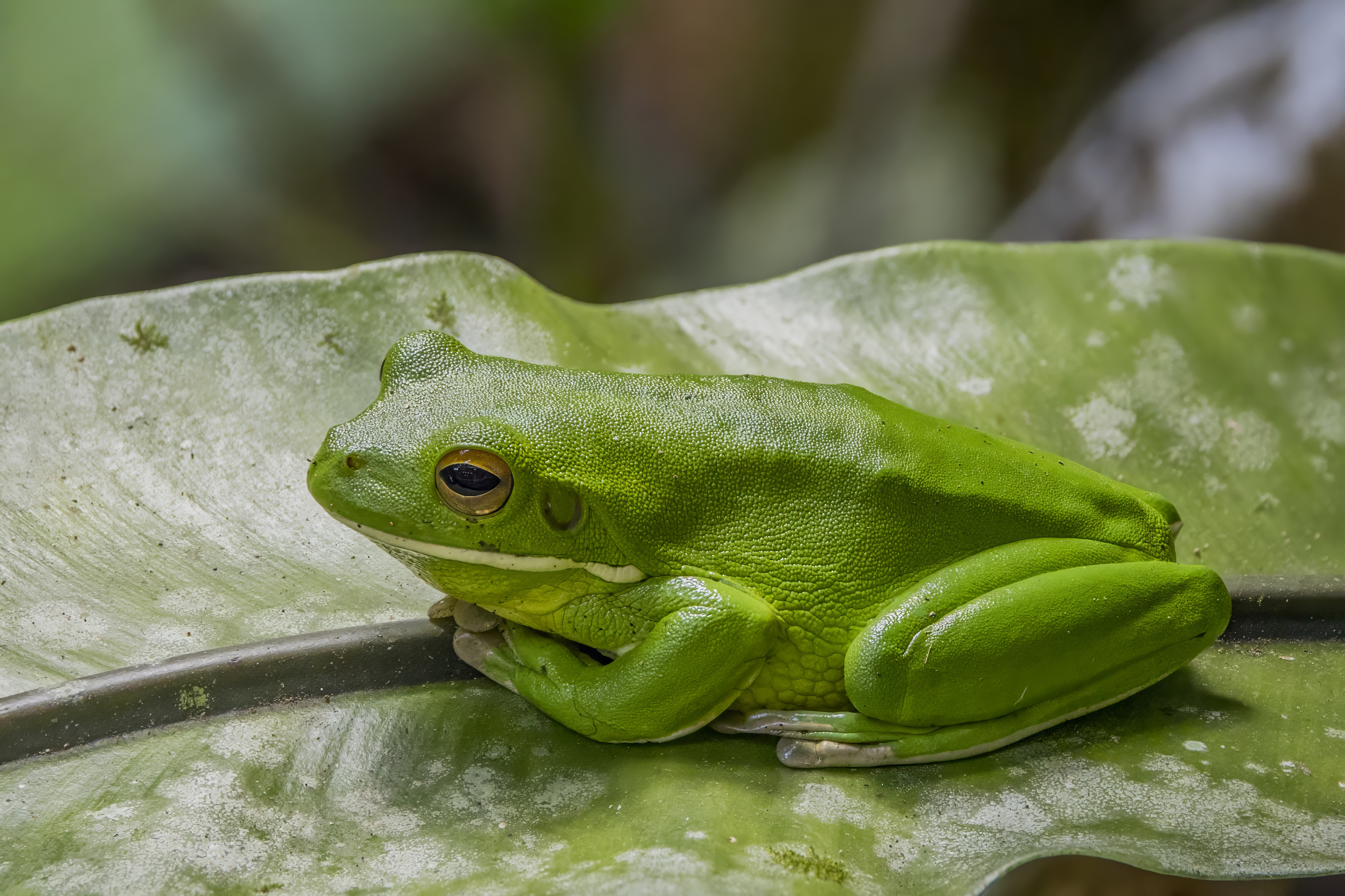
White-lipped tree frog. Daintree rainforest, Queensland

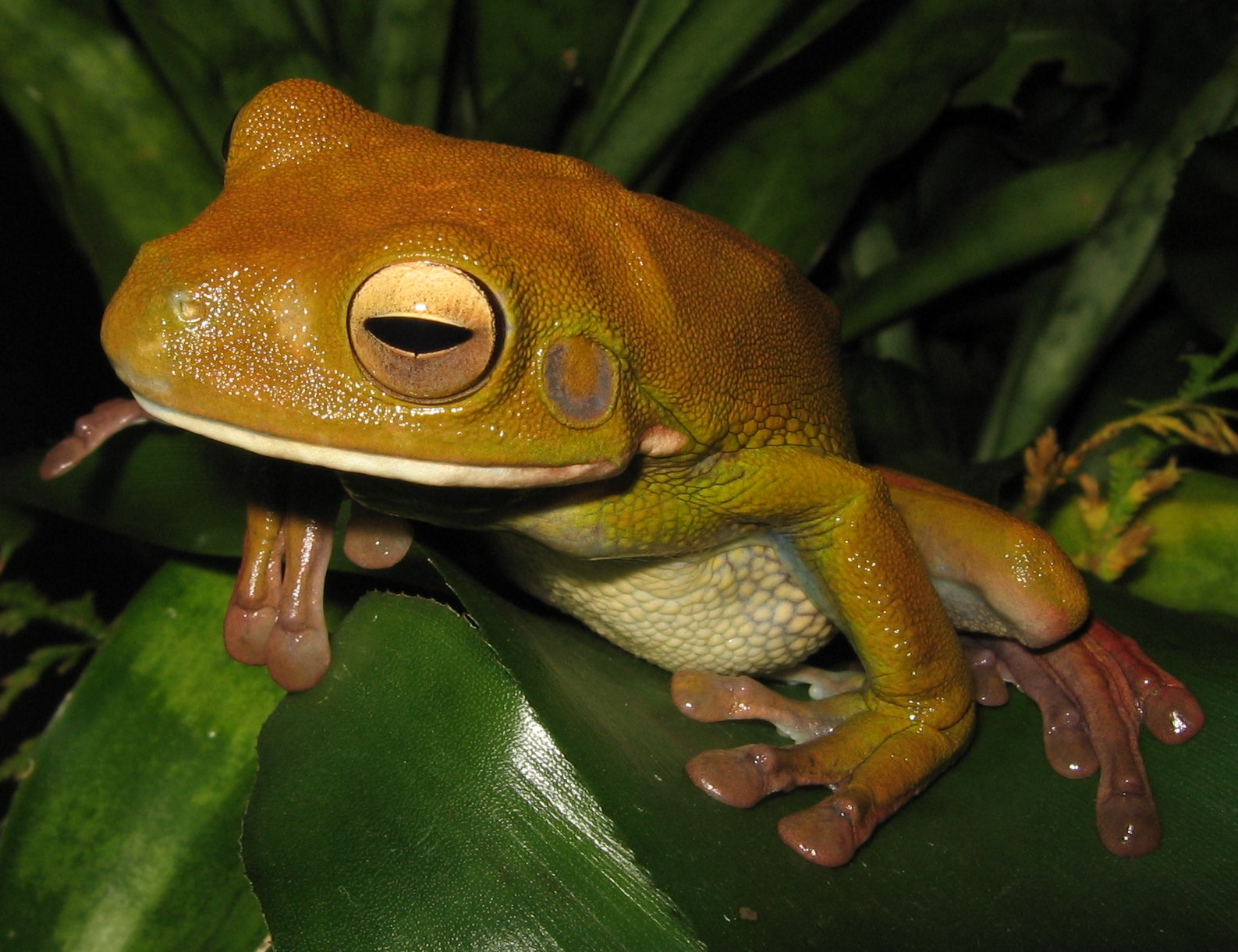
A brown white-lipped tree frog

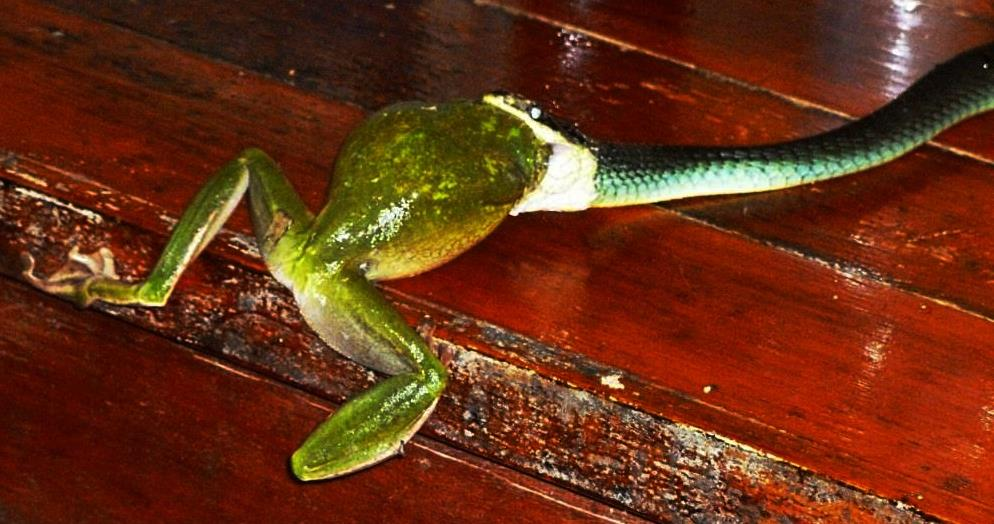
Being eaten by a green tree snake - Dendrelaphis punctulatus near Cooktown, Queensland

The white-lipped tree frog reaches 11–14 cm (4.3–5.5 in) in length. Its weight is typically 30–60 g (1.1–2.1 oz). Females are larger than males, and have thicker skin in correlation with the difference in body size. Its dorsal surface is usually bright green, although the colour changes depending on the temperature and background, and can be brown. The ventral surface is off-white. The lower lip has a distinctive white stripe (giving this species its name), which continues to the shoulder. The white stripes on the trailing edges of the lower leg may turn pink in the breeding male. The white-lipped tree frog has large toe pads, which aid it to climb. The toes are completely webbed, and the hands are partially webbed.

== Ecology and behaviour ==
The white-lipped tree frog is found along the coastal areas of Cape York Peninsula and the wet tropics of north-eastern Queensland, Australia. It is the most widely distributed tree frog in the New Guinea region, spanning from eastern Indonesia, through the New Guinea mainland, to the Bismarck and the Admiralty Islands in the north. It lives in rainforests, cultivated areas, and around houses in coastal areas, and is restricted to areas below 1,200 m (3,900 ft) in altitude.

It has a loud, barking call, but when distressed, it makes a cat-like "mew" sound or may discharge urine. Males call during spring and summer after rain from vegetation around the breeding site, normally a still body of water.

Its diet is mainly insects and other arthropods. One individual was observed successfully preying on (and eating) an olive-backed sunbird. It can live to over 10 years in the wild.

This species of frog is known for being moved around in fruit produce from northern Australia and ending up becoming a lost frog in southern areas.

== As a pet ==
It is kept as a pet; but in Australia, it may be kept in captivity only with an appropriate permit.
