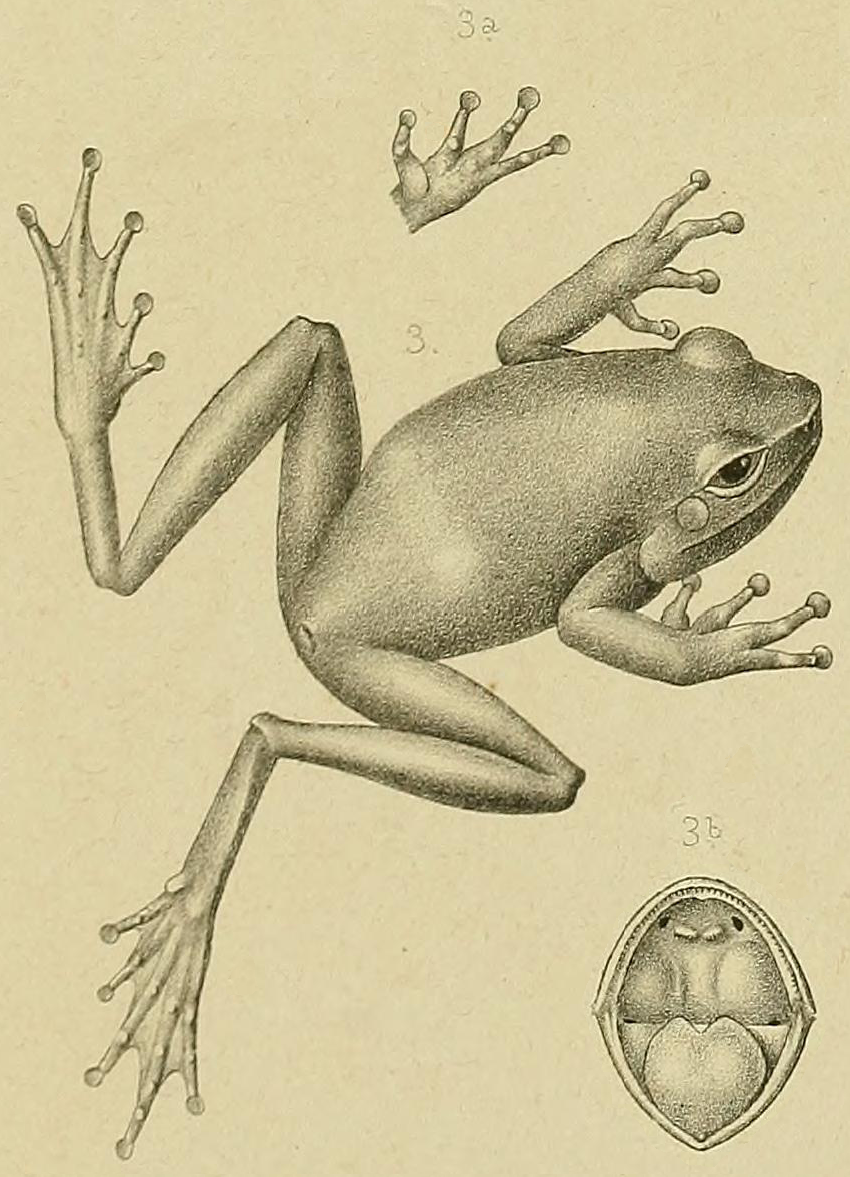
- L. vagabunda, (a) underside of hand, and (b) open mouth.

Conservation status
- Data Deficient (IUCN 3.1)

Scientific classification
- Kingdom: Animalia
- Phylum: Chordata
- Class: Amphibia
- Order: Anura
- Family: Pelodryadidae
- Genus: Chlorohyla
- Species: C. vagabunda

Binomial name
- Chlorohyla vagabunda (Peters and Doria, 1878)

Synonyms
- Hyla (Litoria) vagabunda Peters and Doria, 1878

= Wahai tree frog =

Species of amphibian

The Wahai tree frog (Chlorohyla vagabunda) is a species of frog in the family Pelodryadidae, endemic to Indonesia and known from the Vogelkop Peninsula in north-western New Guinea and from Seram Island, one of the Maluku Islands (also known as the Moluccas). Little is known about this lowland species that has not been collected after it was described in 1878.
