= Chlorohyla auae =

Conservation status
- Least Concern (IUCN 3.1)

Scientific classification
- Kingdom: Animalia
- Phylum: Chordata
- Class: Amphibia
- Order: Anura
- Family: Pelodryadidae
- Genus: Chlorohyla
- Species: C. auae

Binomial name
- Chlorohyla auae (Menzies & Tyler, 2004)

Synonyms
- Litoria auae Menzies & Tyler, 2004; Ranoidea auae

Species of frog

Chlorohyla auae is a species of frog in the family Pelodryadidae that is endemic to Papua New Guinea. Its natural habitats are swamps, freshwater marshes, intermittent freshwater marshes, and canals and ditches.
