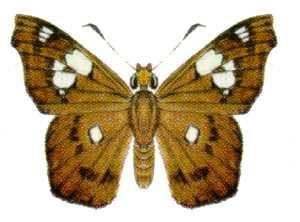

Scientific classification
- Kingdom: Animalia
- Phylum: Arthropoda
- Class: Insecta
- Order: Lepidoptera
- Family: Hesperiidae
- Genus: Netrocoryne
- Species: N. repanda

Binomial name
- Netrocoryne repanda C. & R. Felder, 1867

Synonyms
- Goniloba vulpecula Prittwitz, 1868; Netrocoryne vulpecula (Prittwitz, 1868); Netrocoryne expansa Waterhouse, 1932

= Netrocoryne repanda =

Species of butterfly

Netrocoryne repanda, the bronze flat, eastern bronze flat, or eastern flat, is a butterfly found in Australia, belonging to the subfamily Pyrginae of the family Hesperiidae.

== Gallery ==
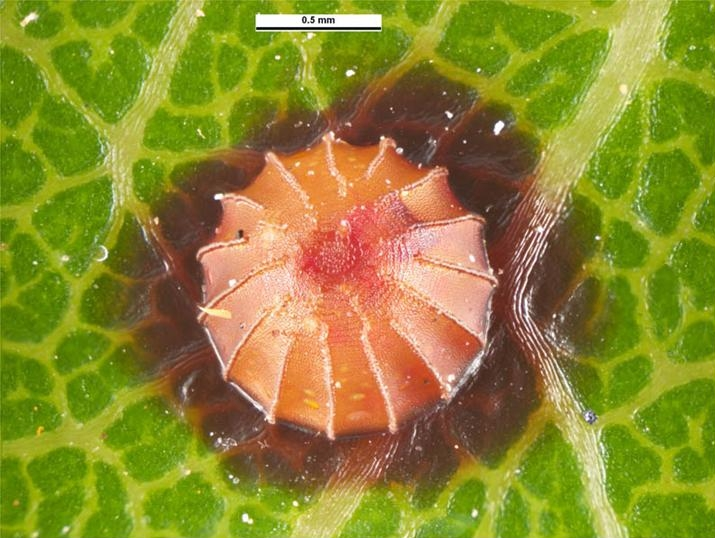
Egg, dorsal view

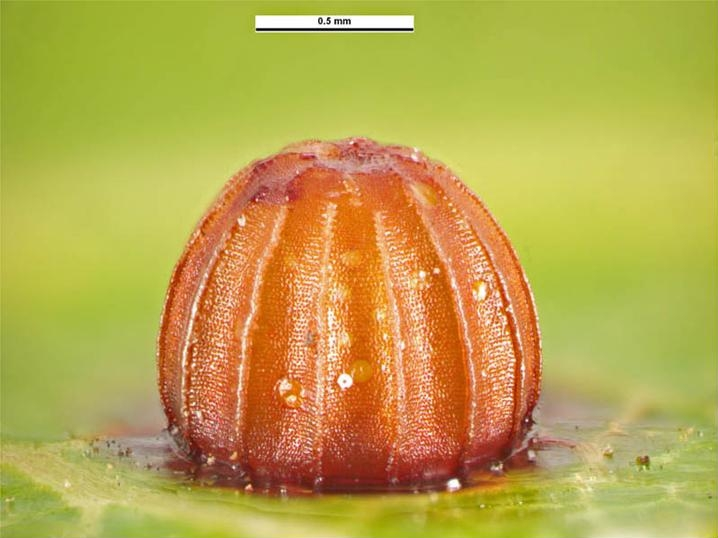
Egg, lateral view

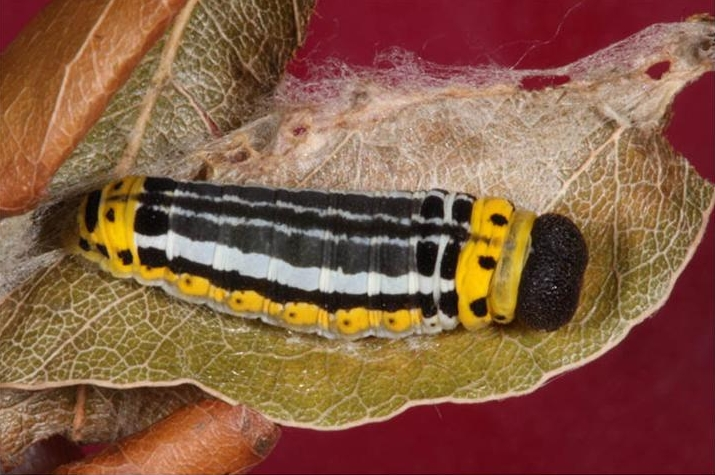
Larva

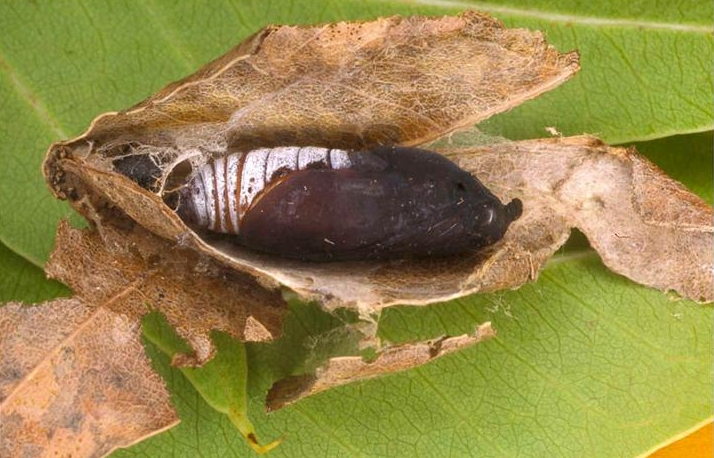
Pupa

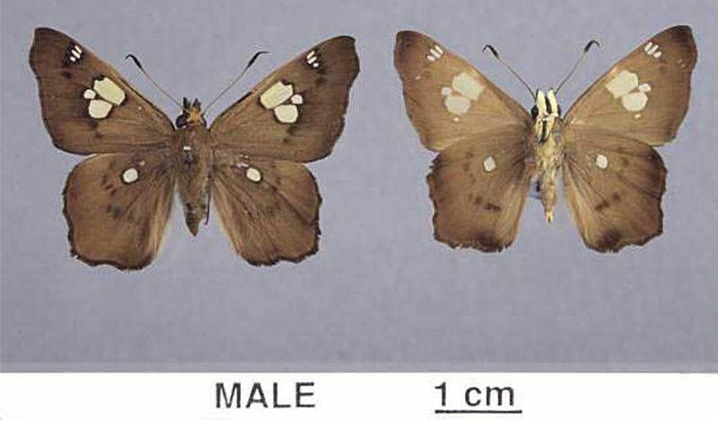
Male

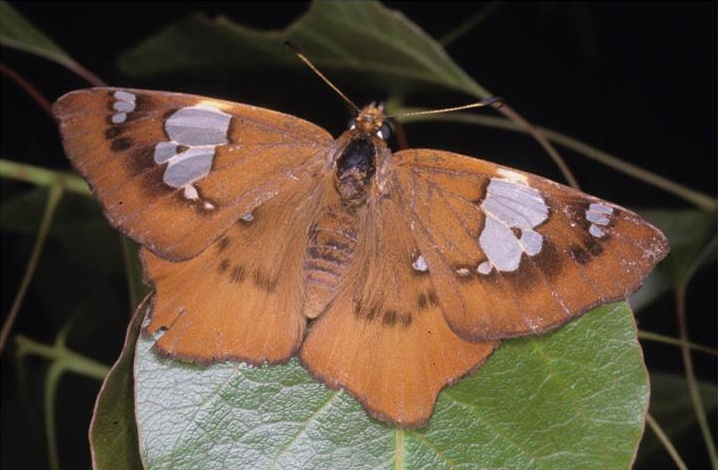
Female
