= Whian Whian State Conservation Area =

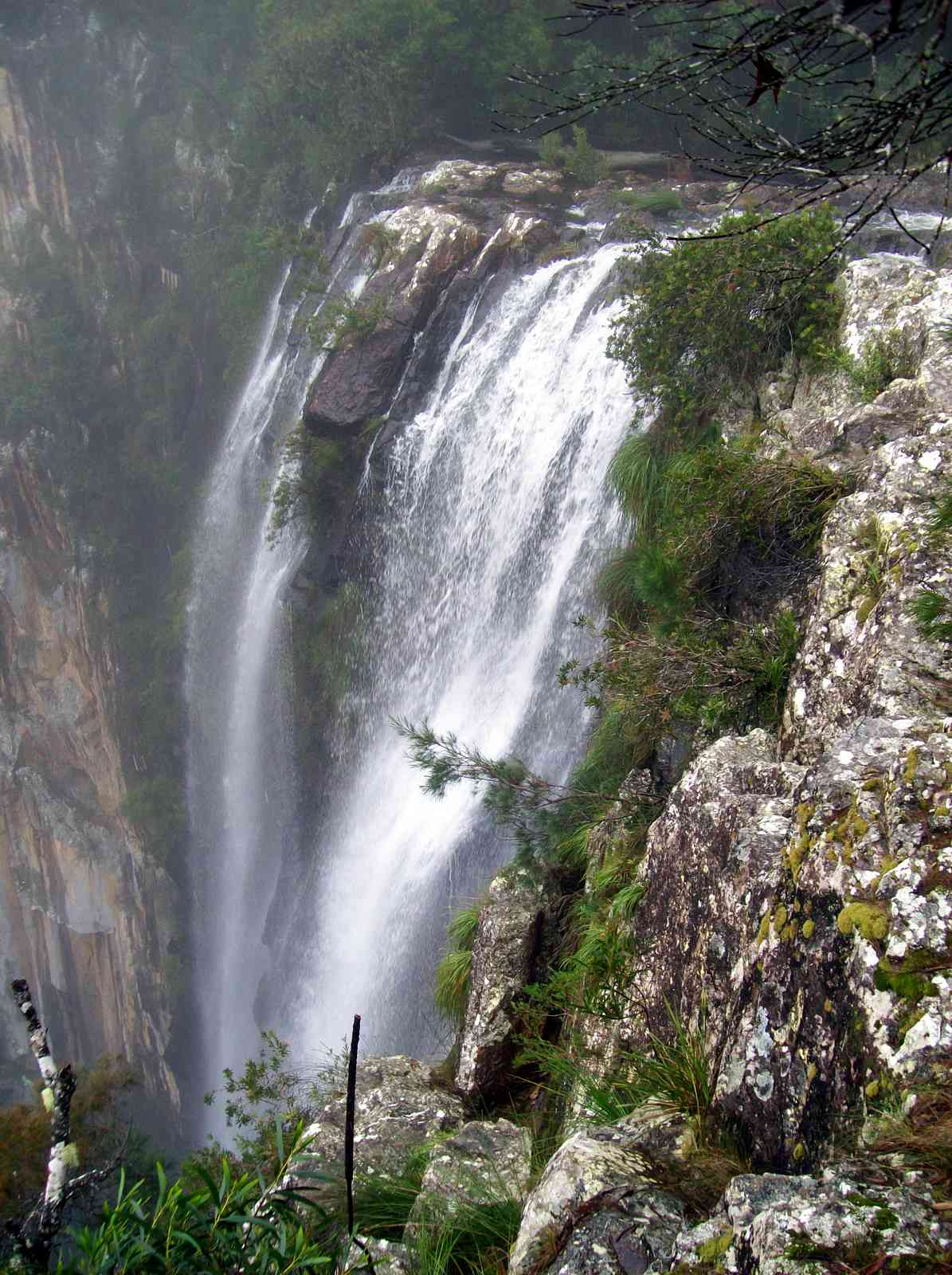
- The Minyon Falls

- Location within New South Wales
- Location: Northern Rivers, New South Wales, Australia
- Coordinates: 28°36′55″S 153°23′05″E
- Type: Plunge waterfall
- Elevation: 200 metres (660 ft) AHD
- Total height: 100 metres (330 ft)
- Watercourse: Repentance Creek

Whian Whian State Conservation Area is one of the protected areas of New South Wales, operated by the NSW National Parks and Wildlife Service.

The Conservation Area is west of Byron Bay, New South Wales and north of Lismore, New South Wales, in the Northern Rivers region of New South Wales.

The Conservation Area lies within the Nightcap National Park and both areas are Gondwana Rainforests of Australia World Heritage Sites. A main attraction in the park is Minyon Falls.

== See also ==
- List of reduplicated Australian place names
