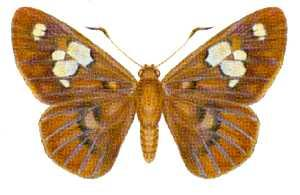
- Chaetocneme denitza

Scientific classification
- Kingdom: Animalia
- Phylum: Arthropoda
- Clade: Pancrustacea
- Class: Insecta
- Order: Lepidoptera
- Family: Hesperiidae
- Subfamily: Tagiadinae
- Tribe: Netrocorynini
- Genus: Chaetocneme; Felder, 1860

Type species
- Chaetocneme corvus Felder, 1860

Species
- Several, see text

= Chaetocneme =

Genus of butterflies

Chaetocneme is genus of skipper butterflies in the family Hesperiidae.

The genus was established in 1860 with "Chaetocneme corvus" – then newly described as it was believed – as the type species. However, the same species was already described by Pieter Cramer in 1775 under the name "Papilio helirius". Thus, the type species is nowadays called Chaetocneme helirius.

== Selected species ==
- Chaetocneme beata
- Chaetocneme denitza
- Chaetocneme helirius
- Chaetocneme richardsi
