= Chlorohyla elkeae =

Conservation status
- Least Concern (IUCN 3.1)

Scientific classification
- Kingdom: Animalia
- Phylum: Chordata
- Class: Amphibia
- Order: Anura
- Family: Pelodryadidae
- Genus: Chlorohyla
- Species: C. elkeae

Binomial name
- Chlorohyla elkeae (Günther & Richards, 2000)

Synonyms
- Litoria elkeae (Günther & Richards, 2000); Ranoidea elkeae

Species of frog

Chlorohyla elkeae is a species of frog in the family Pelodryadidae. It is endemic to West Papua, Indonesia. Its natural habitats are subtropical or tropical moist lowland forests, swamps, freshwater marshes, intermittent freshwater marshes, and heavily degraded former forest.

== Sources ==
- IUCN SSC Amphibian Specialist Group (2020). "Litoria elkeae". IUCN Red List of Threatened Species. 2020 e.T55721A152544482. doi:10.2305/IUCN.UK.2020-3.RLTS.T55721A152544482.en.
