= Chlorohyla robinsonae =

Scientific classification
- Kingdom: Animalia
- Phylum: Chordata
- Class: Amphibia
- Order: Anura
- Family: Pelodryadidae
- Genus: Chlorohyla
- Species: C. robinsonae

Binomial name
- Chlorohyla robinsonae (Oliver, Stuart-Fox, and Richards, 2008)

Synonyms
- Litoria robinsonae Oliver, Stuart-Fox, and Richards, 2008; Dryopsophus robinsonae (Oliver, Stuart-Fox, and Richards, 2008)

Species of amphibian

Chlorohyla robinsonae is a species of frog in the family Pelodryadidae, endemic to Papua New Guinea.

The skin of the dorsum mostly green in color with pale stripes. Three adult male frogs were found to measure 28.3–28.7 mm in snout-vent length. Some of these frogs have dark spots.
