= Chlorohyla kumae =

Conservation status
- Least Concern (IUCN 3.1)

Scientific classification
- Kingdom: Animalia
- Phylum: Chordata
- Class: Amphibia
- Order: Anura
- Family: Pelodryadidae
- Genus: Chlorohyla
- Species: C. kumae

Binomial name
- Chlorohyla kumae (Menzies & Tyler, 2004)

Synonyms
- Litoria kumae Menzies & Tyler, 2004

Species of frog

Chlorohyla kumae is a species of frog in the family Pelodryadidae, endemic to Papua New Guinea. Its natural habitats are subtropical or tropical moist montane forests, freshwater marshes, intermittent freshwater marshes, rural gardens, heavily degraded former forests, ponds, and aquaculture ponds.
