= Chlorohyla eschata =

Scientific classification
- Kingdom: Animalia
- Phylum: Chordata
- Class: Amphibia
- Order: Anura
- Family: Pelodryadidae
- Genus: Chlorohyla
- Species: C. eschata

Binomial name
- Chlorohyla eschata (Kraus and Allen Allison, 2009)

Synonyms
- Litoria eschata (Kraus and Allison, 2009); Dryopsophus eschatus (Kraus and Allison, 2009); Ranoidea eschatus (Kraus and Allison, 2009)

Species of tree frog

Chlorohyla eschata is a species of tree frog in the subfamily Pelodryadinae. It is endemic to Papua New Guinea and has been observed on Rossel Island and Sudest Island, which are part of the Louisiade Archipelago.
