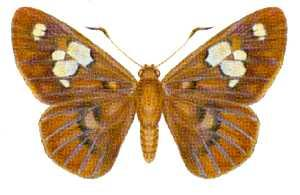

Scientific classification
- Kingdom: Animalia
- Phylum: Arthropoda
- Class: Insecta
- Order: Lepidoptera
- Family: Hesperiidae
- Genus: Chaetocneme
- Species: C. denitza

Binomial name
- Chaetocneme denitza (Hewitson, 1867)

Synonyms
- Netrocoryne denitza Hewitson, 1867

= Chaetocneme denitza =

Species of butterfly

Chaetocneme denitza, commonly known as the rare red-eye (Note: also spelled redeye.) or ornate dusk-flat, is a species of butterfly in the skipper family Hesperiidae. It is endemic to Australia.
