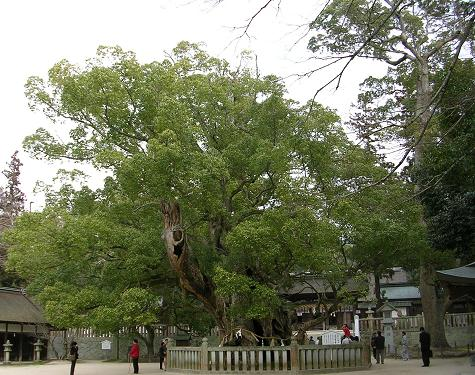
- An ancient camphor tree (estimated to be over 1,000 years old) in Japan

Conservation status
- Least Concern (IUCN 3.1)

Scientific classification
- Kingdom: Plantae
- Clade: Tracheophytes
- Clade: Angiosperms
- Clade: Magnoliids
- Order: Laurales
- Family: Lauraceae
- Genus: Camphora
- Species: C. officinarum

Binomial name
- Camphora officinarum Boerh. ex Fabr.

Synonyms
- Camphora camphora (L.) H.Karst.; Camphorina camphora (L.) Farw.; Cinnamomum camphora (L.) J.Presl.; Laurus camphora L.; Persea camphora (L.) Spreng.

= Camphora officinarum =

Species of tree

Camphora officinarum is a species of evergreen tree indigenous to warm temperate to subtropical regions of East Asia, including countries such as China, Taiwan, Vietnam, Korea, Japan and India. It is known by various names, most notably the camphor tree, camphorwood or camphor laurel.

== Description ==
Camphora officinarum grows up to 20–30 m (66–98 ft) tall. In Japan, where the tree is called kusunoki, five camphor trees are known with a trunk circumference above 20 m (66 ft), with the largest individual, Kamō no Ōkusu (蒲生の大楠; "Great camphor of Kamō"), reaching 24.22 m (79 1/2 ft).

The leaves have a glossy, waxy appearance and smell of camphor when crushed. In spring, it produces bright green foliage with masses of very small white fragrant flowers from which its common namesake "smells good tree" in Chinese 香樟 xiang zhang was given. It produces clusters of black, berry-like fruit around 1 cm (3/8 in) in diameter. Its pale bark is very rough and fissured vertically.

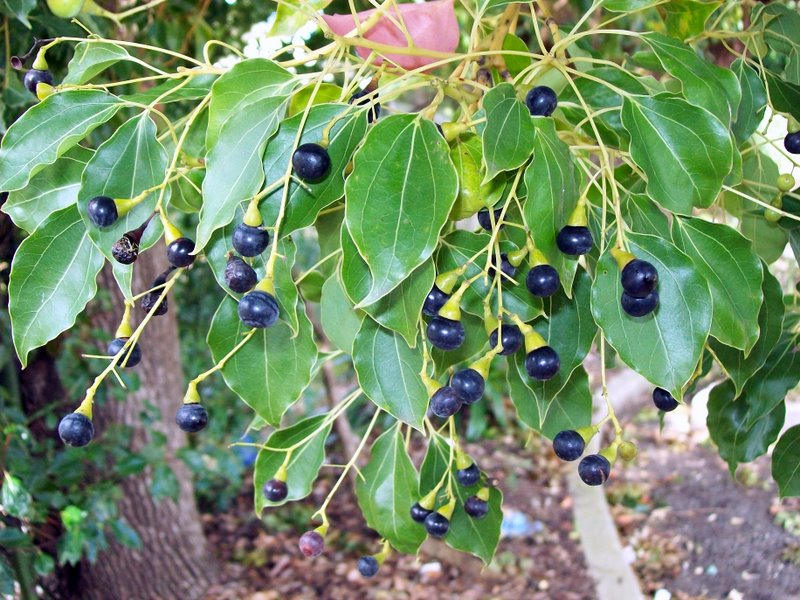
Foliage and fruit in Sydney, Australia

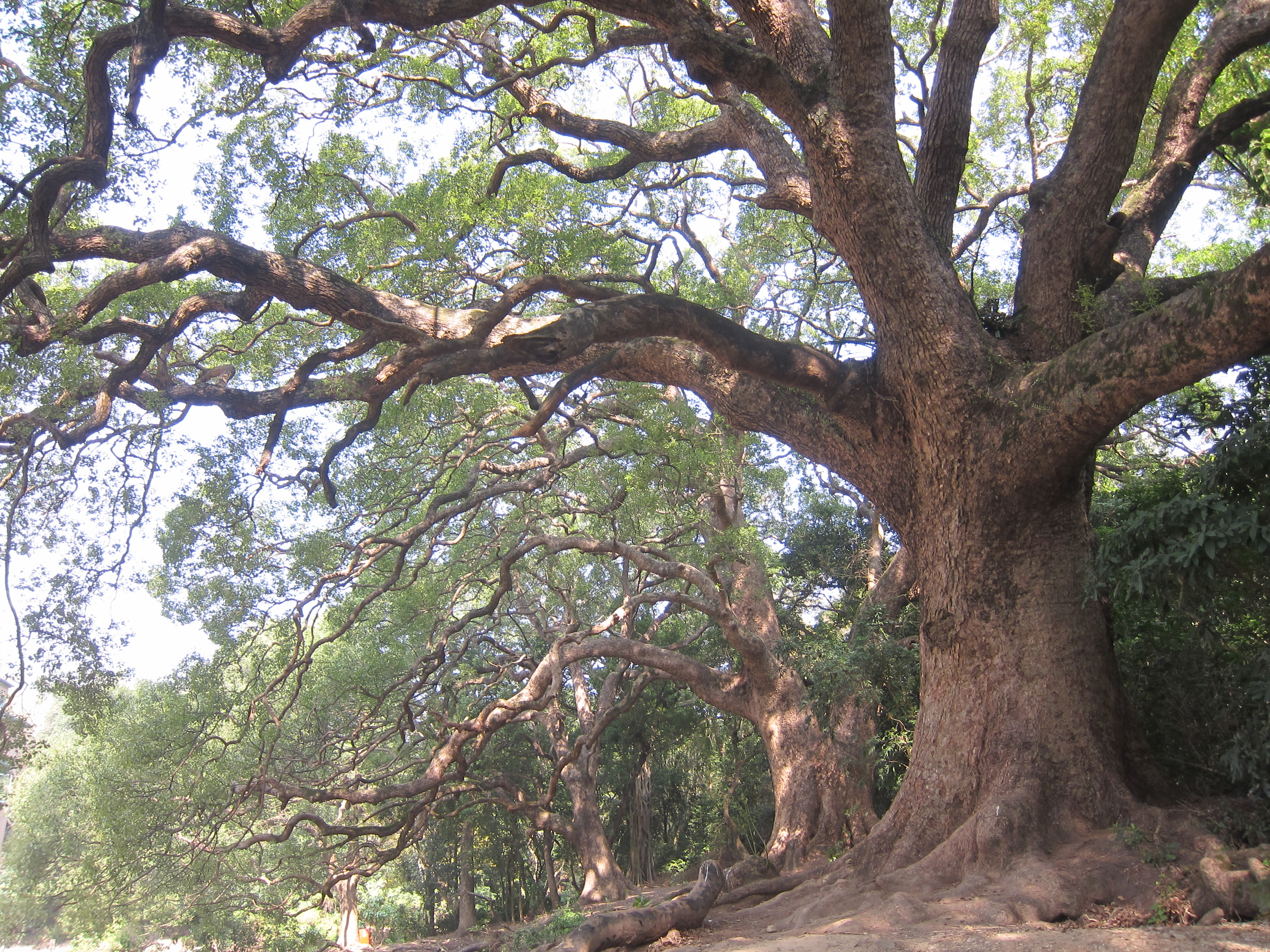
Camphor grove in Hong Kong

== Distribution and habitat ==
The species is native to Japan, Korea, the Ryukyu Islands, and Taiwan. It has been introduced to China south of the Yangtze River, the Himalayas, Bangladesh, Cambodia, Laos, Vietnam, eastern Australia, the southeastern United States, and many other countries.

== Ecology ==
In Australia, the larval stages of two native butterflies, the purple brown-eye and common red-eye feed on camphor despite it being an introduced plant.

=== As an invasive species ===
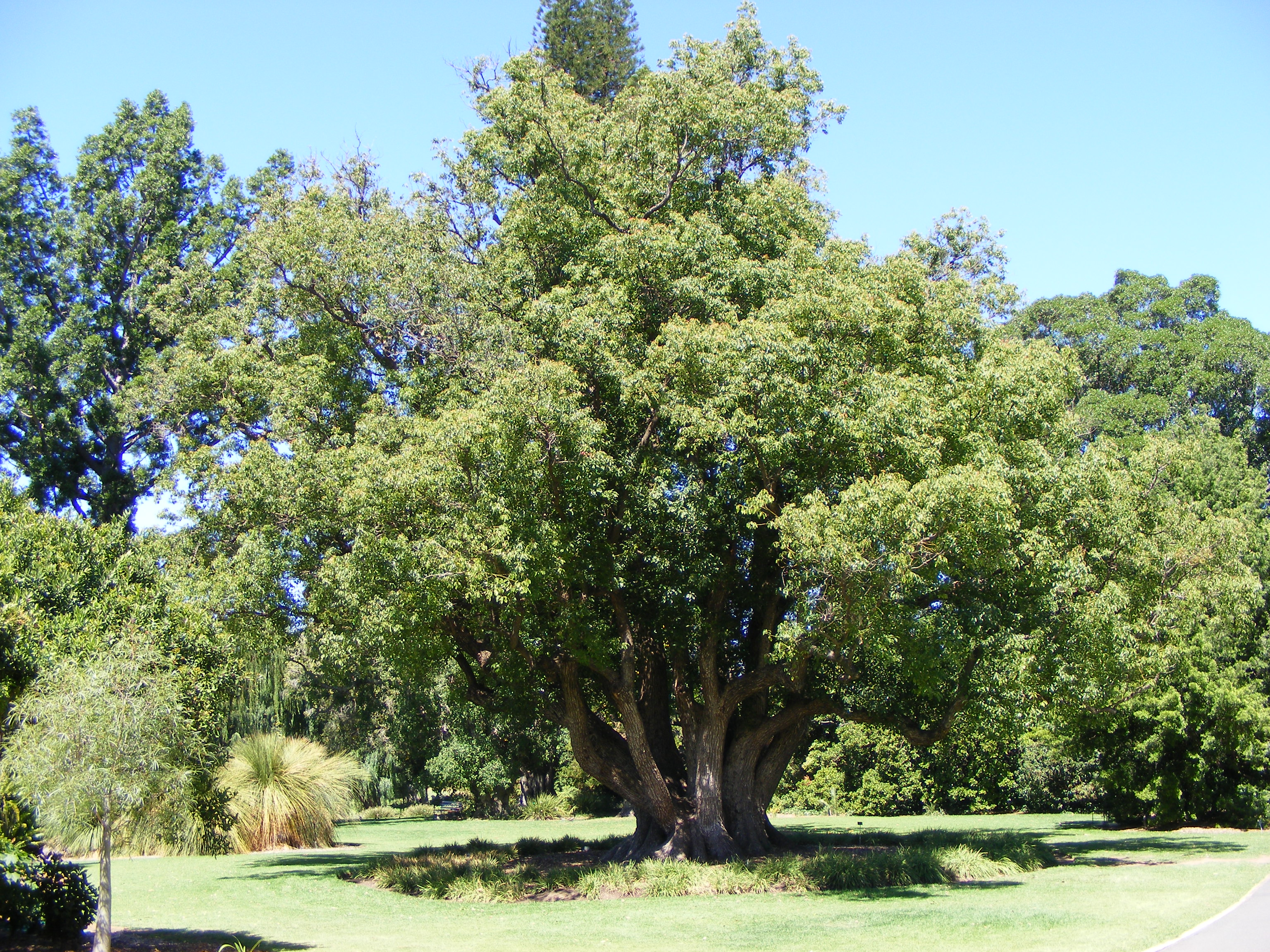
Public gardens in Adelaide, South Australia

=== In Australia ===
Camphor laurel was introduced to Australia in 1822 as an ornamental tree for use in gardens and public parks. It has become a noxious weed throughout Queensland and central to northern New South Wales, where it is suited to the wet, subtropical climate. The camphor content of the leaf litter helps prevent other plants from germinating successfully, helping to ensure the camphor's success against any potentially competing vegetation, and the seeds are attractive to birds and pass intact through the digestive system, ensuring rapid distribution. Camphor laurel invades rainforests and pastures, and also competes against eucalyptus trees, certain species of which are the sole food source of koalas. In its favour, however, younger camphor laurel trees can quickly develop hollows, which can be utilised by wildlife, whereas natives can take hundreds of years to develop hollows.

=== In the United States ===
Introduced to the contiguous United States around 1875, the species has become naturalized in portions of Alabama, California, Florida, Virginia, Georgia, Hawaii, Louisiana, Mississippi, North Carolina, Texas, and South Carolina. It has been declared a category I invasive species in Florida.

== Uses ==
The species is cultivated for camphor and timber production. The production and shipment of camphor, in a solid, waxy form, was a major industry in Taiwan prior to and during the Japanese colonial era (1895–1945). It was used medicinally and was also an important ingredient in the production of smokeless gunpowder and celluloid. Primitive stills were set up in the mountainous areas in which the tree is usually found. The wood was chipped; these chips were steamed in a retort, allowing the camphor to crystallize on the inside of a crystallization box after the vapour had passed through a cooling chamber. It was then scraped off and packed out to government-run factories for processing and sale. Camphor was one of the most lucrative of several important government monopolies under the Japanese.

The wood has an insect-repellent quality.

=== Camphor ===
Camphor is a white crystalline substance, obtained from the tree C. camphora. Camphor has been used for many centuries as a culinary spice, a component of incense, and as a medicine. It is also an insect repellent and a flea-killing substance.

=== Chemical constituents ===
The species contains volatile chemical compounds in all plant parts, and the wood and leaves are steam distilled for the essential oils. Camphor laurel has six different chemical variants called chemotypes, which are camphor, linalool, 1,8-cineole, nerolidol, safrole, and borneol. In China, field workers avoid mixing chemotypes when harvesting by their odour.

Camphor type
This type is dominant in India and Sri Lanka. The wood oil is separated into four fractions after camphor is removed by filtration, termed white, yellow, brown, and blue camphor oil. Oil contains 54–97% camphor.
Linalool type
This type is commonly found in Taiwan and Japan. Oil contains 80–85 linalool (another source gives a wider range of 58–92%). The leaf oil is called "ho leaf oil", the wood oil "ho wood oil" (after removal of safrole), and the mixture of both "shiu oil".
Cineole (eucalyptol) type
This type is dominant in Madagascar. The oil contains 40–50% cineole (another source gives 32–52%). The essential oil from the Madagascar tree leaves is commercially known as ravintsara.
The cineole fraction of camphor laurel is used in China to manufacture fake "eucalyptus oil".
Nerolidol type
Oil contains 16–57% nerolidol.
Safrole type
This type is mentioned by few recent sources.
Borneol type
This type is commercially useful in China, as borneol is used in medicine. Oil contains 67–82% (-)-borneol. Increased monoterpene production can be induced by mechanical damage.
Isoborneol type
At least two sources mention this type.

== In culture ==
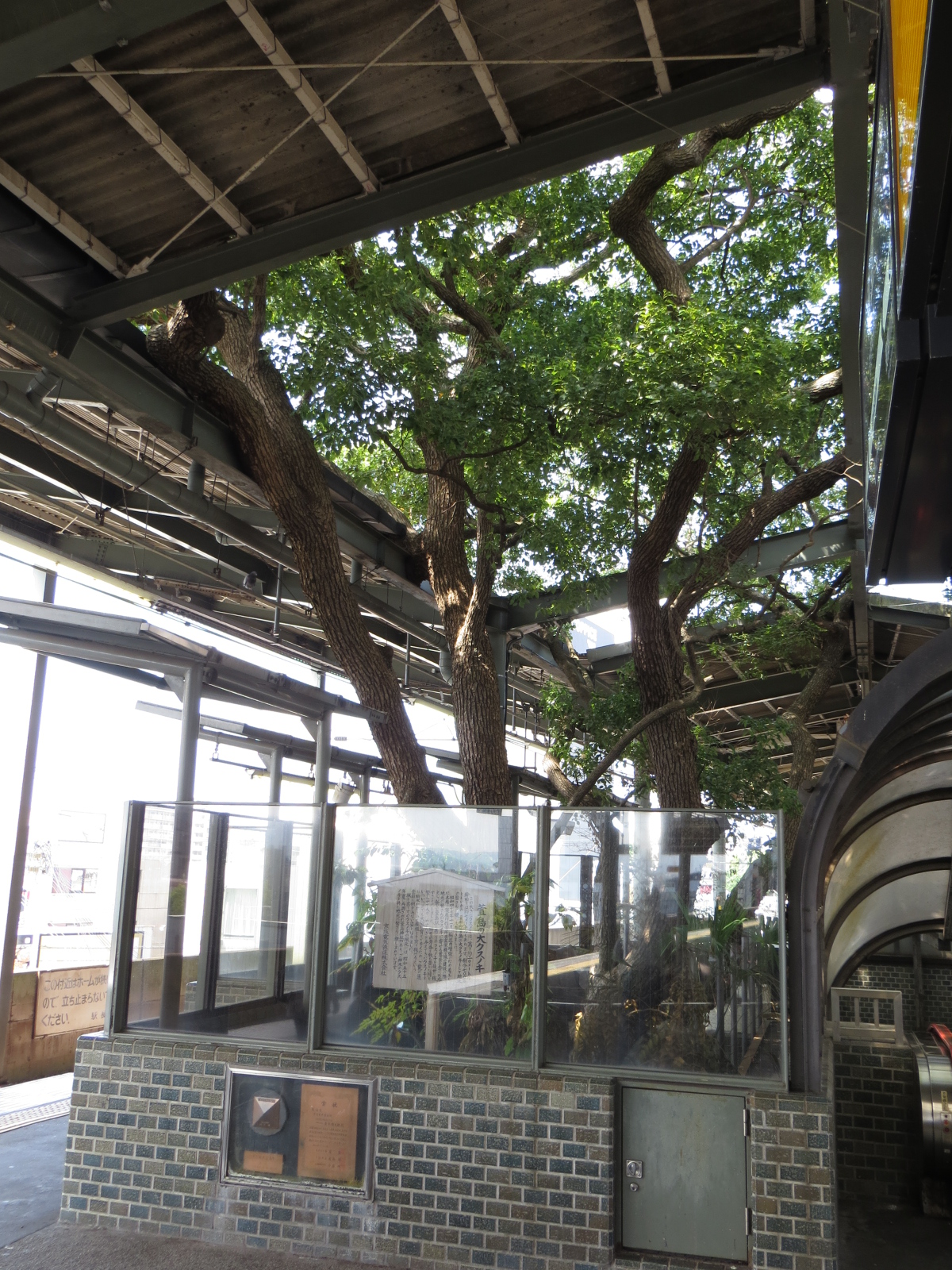
Sacred camphor tree at Kayashima Station

Certain trees in Japan are considered sacred. An example of the importance of a sacred tree is the enshrined 700-year old camphor growing in the middle of Kayashima Station. Locals protested against moving the tree when the railway station had to be expanded, so the station was built around it.

== See also ==
- Sandalwood – Class of woods from trees in the genus Santalum
