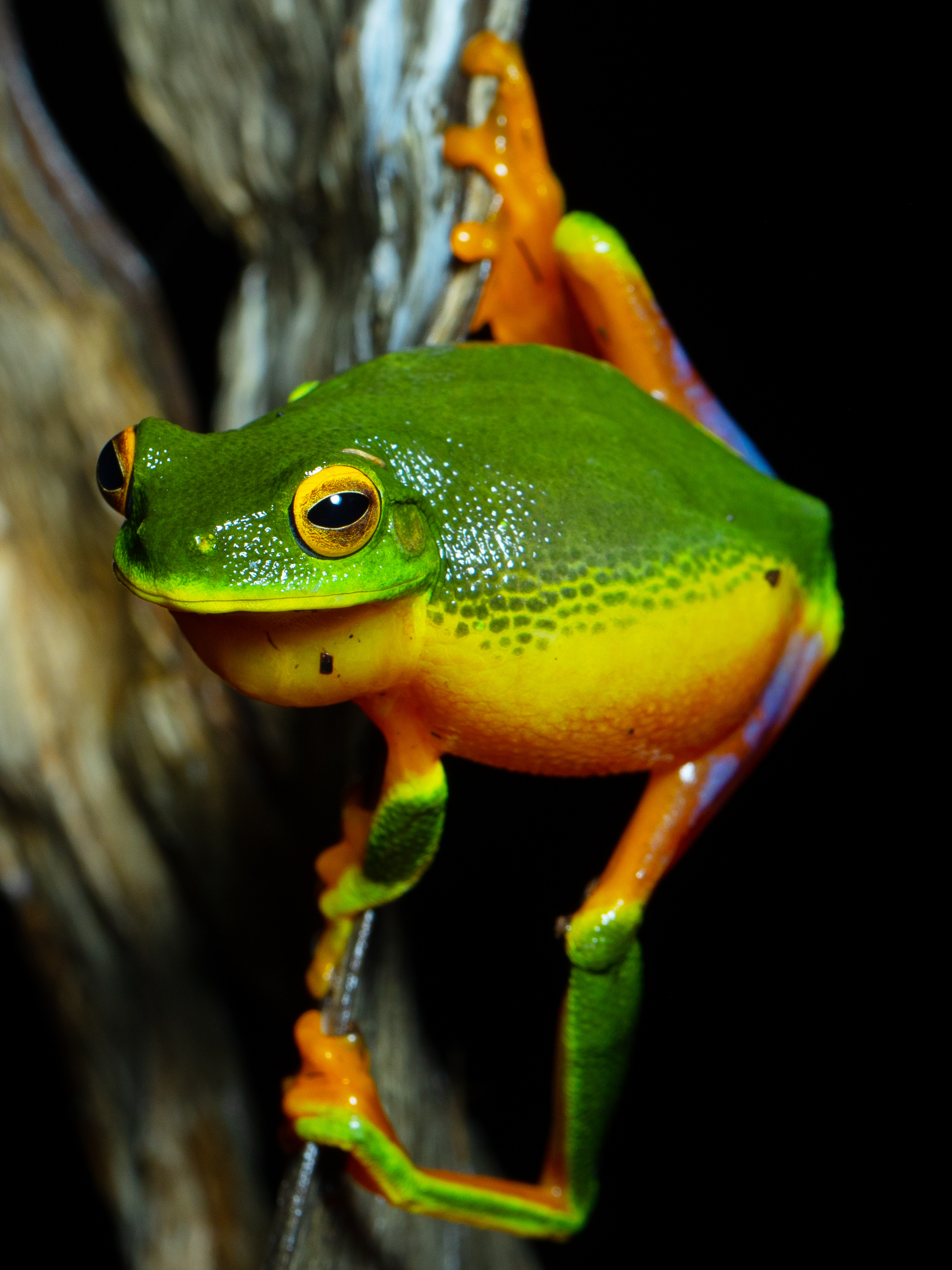

Scientific classification
- Kingdom: Animalia
- Phylum: Chordata
- Class: Amphibia
- Order: Anura
- Family: Pelodryadidae
- Genus: Chlorohyla
- Species: C. bella

Binomial name
- Chlorohyla bella (McDonald, Rowley, Richards, and Frankham, 2016)
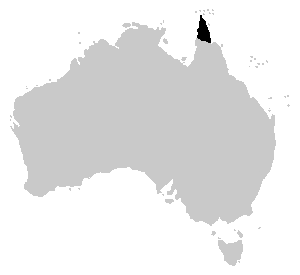

Synonyms
- Litoria bella McDonald, Rowley, Richards, and Frankham, 2016; Ranoidea bella

= Chlorohyla bella =

Species of frog

Chlorohyla bella is a species of frog in the family Pelodryadidae, first found in Cape York Peninsula in Queensland, Australia. The species is most similar to many Chlorohyla species, but can be distinguished by having a large male body size (between 34.5 to 41.8 millimetres (1.36 to 1.65 in)), a "near-immaculate" green dorsum, an orange venter, its bright orange-coloured digits and webbing, the purple lateral surfaces of its thighs, by lacking a canthal stripe, its white bones, and a single-note male advertisement call. It inhabits rainforest and monsoon vine thicket near water.
