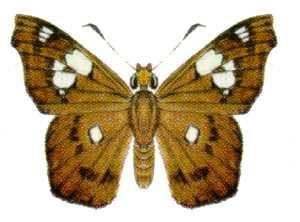
- Netrocoryne repanda

Scientific classification
- Kingdom: Animalia
- Phylum: Arthropoda
- Clade: Pancrustacea
- Class: Insecta
- Order: Lepidoptera
- Family: Hesperiidae
- Subfamily: Tagiadinae
- Genus: Netrocoryne; C. & R.Felder, [1867]

= Netrocoryne =

Genus of butterflies

Netrocoryne is a genus of skipper butterflies (family Hesperiidae). It is typical of the tribe Netrocorynini Grishin, 2019 in the subfamily Tagiadinae.

== Species ==
BioLib and GBIF include:

1. Netrocoryne repanda C.Felder & R.Felder, 1867
2. Netrocoryne thaddeus (Hewitson, 1876)
