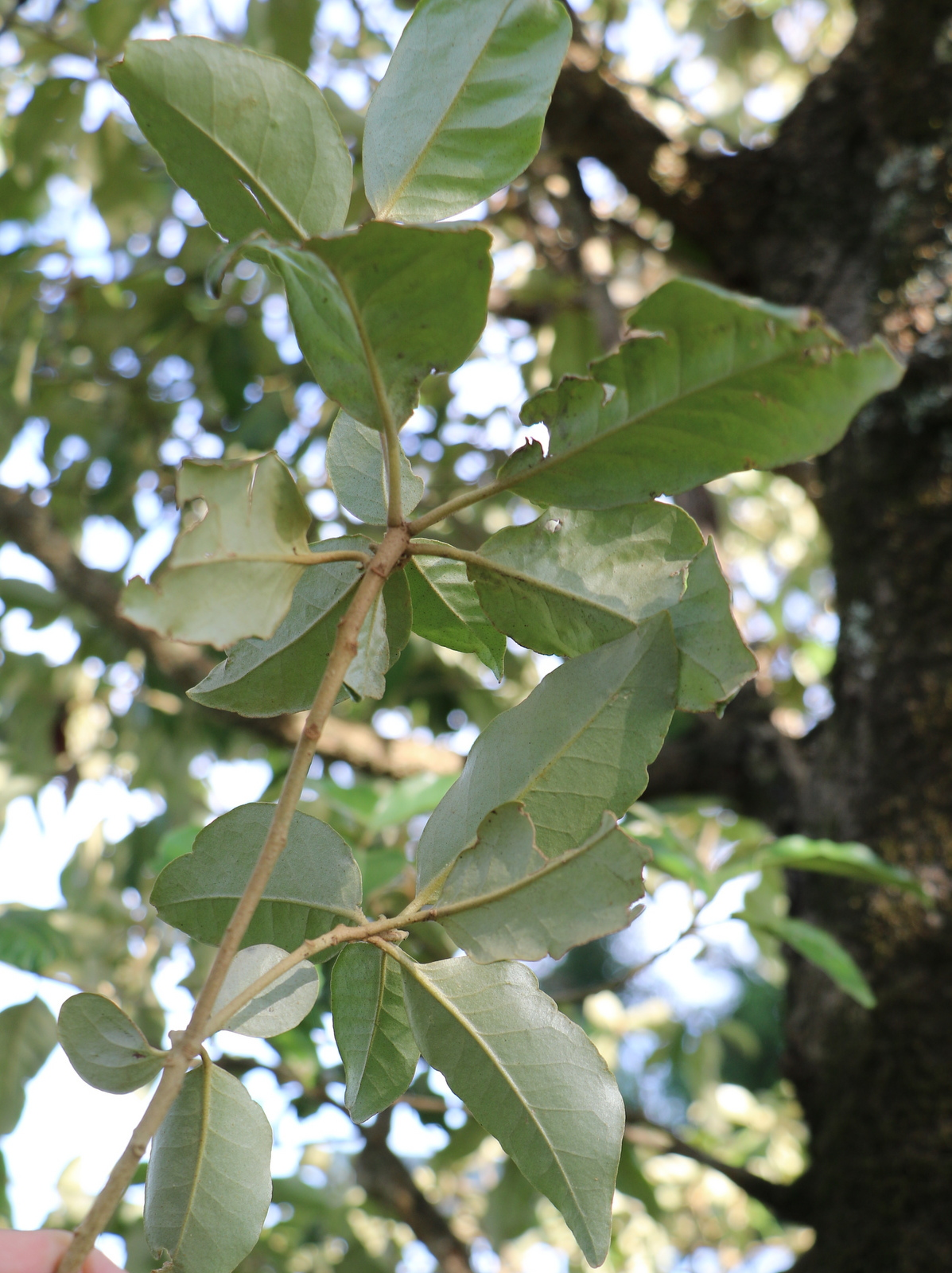
- Mallanganee National Park, NSW

Scientific classification
- Kingdom: Plantae
- Clade: Tracheophytes
- Clade: Angiosperms
- Clade: Eudicots
- Clade: Rosids
- Order: Malpighiales
- Family: Euphorbiaceae
- Genus: Croton
- Species: C. insularis

Binomial name
- Croton insularis Baill.

= Croton insularis =

silver croton

Species of tree

Croton insularis, the silver croton, is a small tree in the spurge family. Growing in dry rainforest and rainforest margins in eastern Australia, north from the Blue Mountains. It is also found in New Caledonia and Vanuatu. Other common names include white croton, cascarilla, native cascarilla and Queensland cascarilla.
