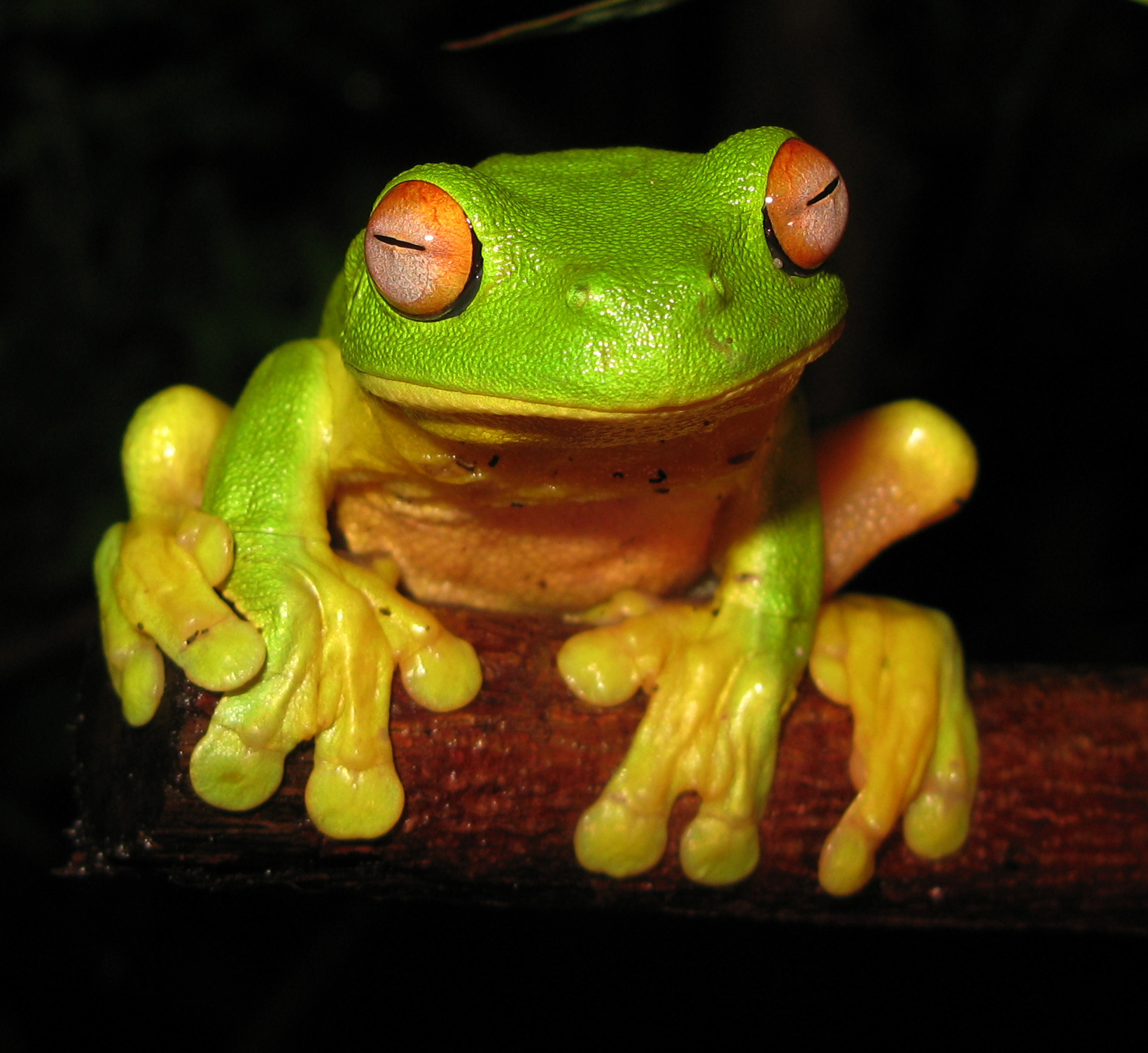

Conservation status
- Least Concern (IUCN 3.1)

Scientific classification
- Kingdom: Animalia
- Phylum: Chordata
- Class: Amphibia
- Order: Anura
- Family: Pelodryadidae
- Genus: Chlorohyla
- Species: C. chloris

Binomial name
- Chlorohyla chloris (Boulenger, 1892)
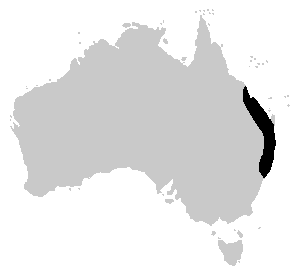
- Distribution of the red-eyed tree frog

Synonyms
- Hyla chloris (Boulenger, 1892); Litoria chloris (Tyler, 1971); Dryomantis chloris (Wells and Wellington, 1985); Dryopsophus chloris (Duellman, Marion, and Hedges, 2016); Ranoidea chloris (Duellman, Marion, and Hedges, 2016)

= Chlorohyla chloris =

Species of amphibian

Chlorohyla chloris, commonly known as the red-eyed tree frog or orange-eyed tree frog, is a species of tree frog native to eastern Australia; ranging from south of Sydney (Nowra area) to Proserpine in mid-northern Queensland.

== Description ==
The red-eyed tree frog is a uniform bright green above, occasionally with yellow spots, and bright yellow on the underside. The front sides of the arms and legs are green, while the underside is yellow or white. The thighs may be blue/purple to blue/black in colour in adults. It has golden eyes at the centre, which change to red towards the edge of the eye. The intensity of the eye colour is variable between frogs. The tympanum is visible, and a mature frog reaches a size of 65 mm.

The tadpoles are generally grey or brown, and can have gold pigment along the side.

A similar species, the orange-thighed frog (Litoria xantheroma) is found north of Proserpine and has orange on the back of the thighs.

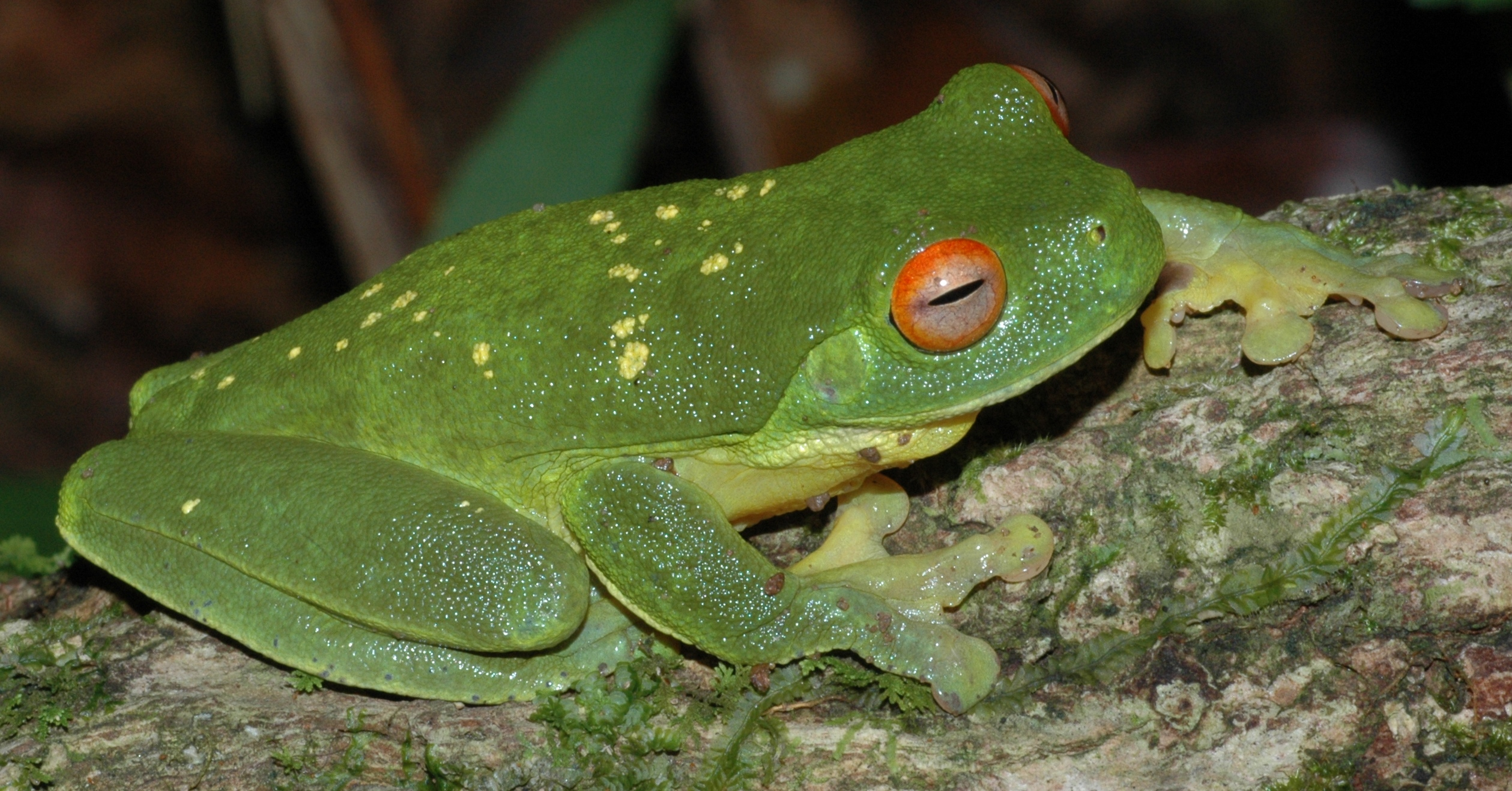
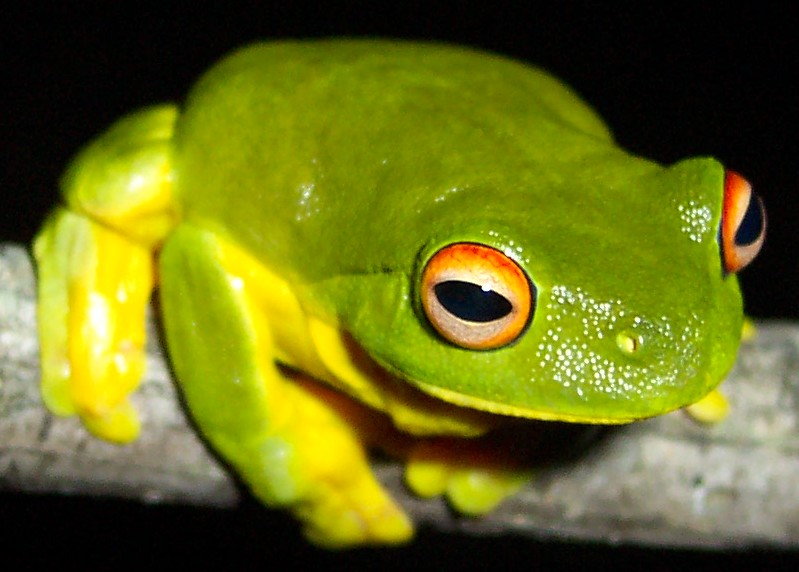
Colour variation within the species: The frog on the left exhibits a darker green dorsal surface with yellow spots, and grey towards the iris. The frog on the right has a plain, bright-green dorsal surface with bright-red eyes.

== Ecology and behaviour ==
This species of frog is associated with rainforests, wet sclerophyll forests, and woodlands. The call is several long, moaning "aaa-rk" sounds, followed by soft trills. Males call and breeding takes place mostly after rain in temporary ponds, roadside ditches, dams, ponds, and creek offshoots where the water is not flowing.

== As a pet ==
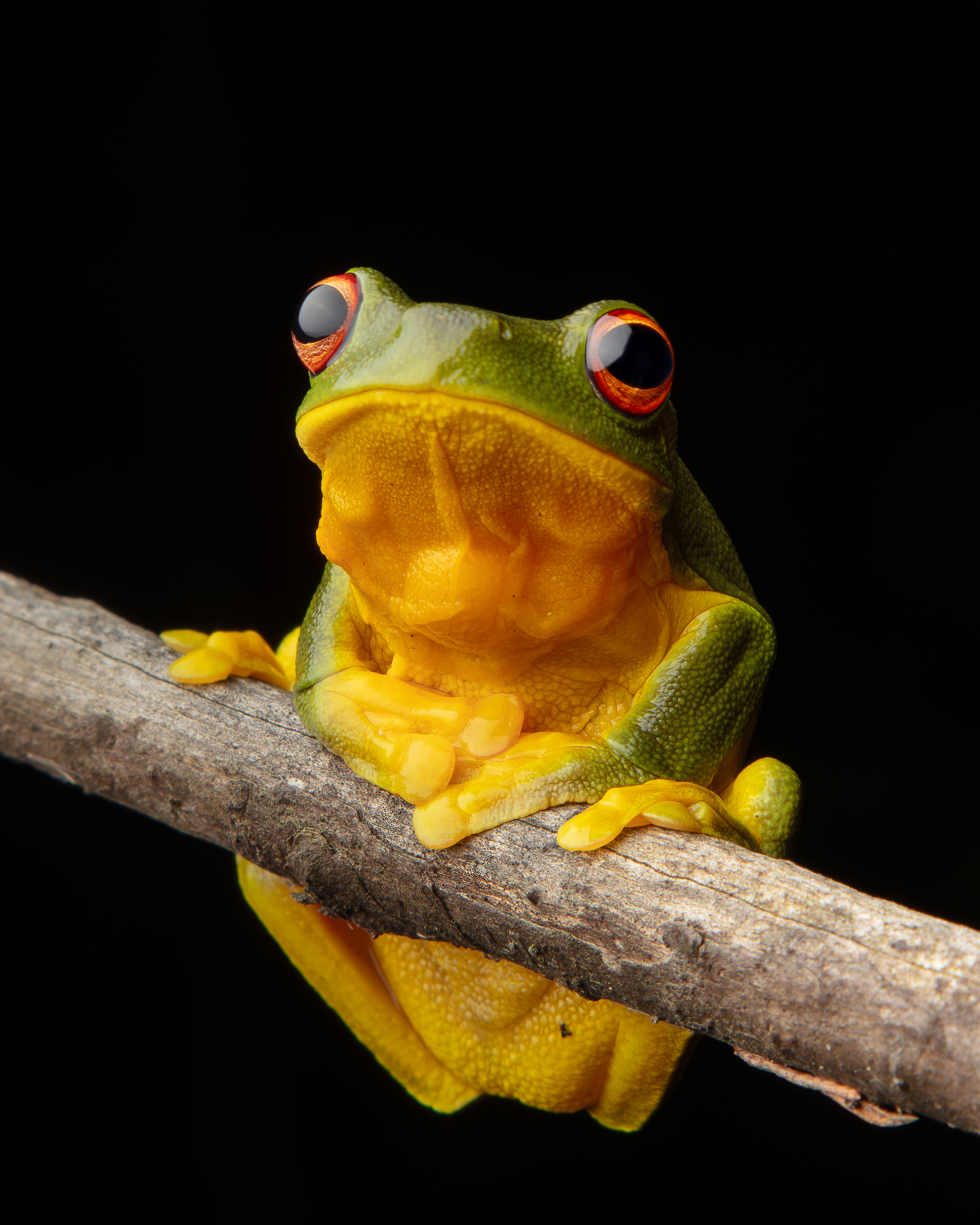
Litoria chloris.

It is kept as a pet. In Australia, this animal may be kept in captivity with the appropriate permit.
