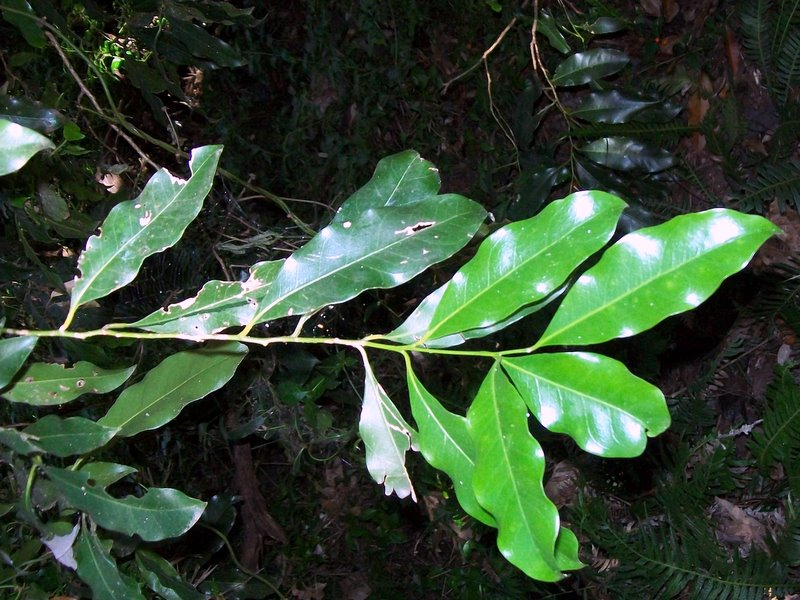
- Foliage

Conservation status
- Least Concern (IUCN 3.1)

Scientific classification
- Kingdom: Plantae
- Clade: Tracheophytes
- Clade: Angiosperms
- Clade: Magnoliids
- Order: Laurales
- Family: Lauraceae
- Genus: Endiandra
- Species: E. compressa

Binomial name
- Endiandra compressa C.T.White

= Endiandra compressa =

Species of tree

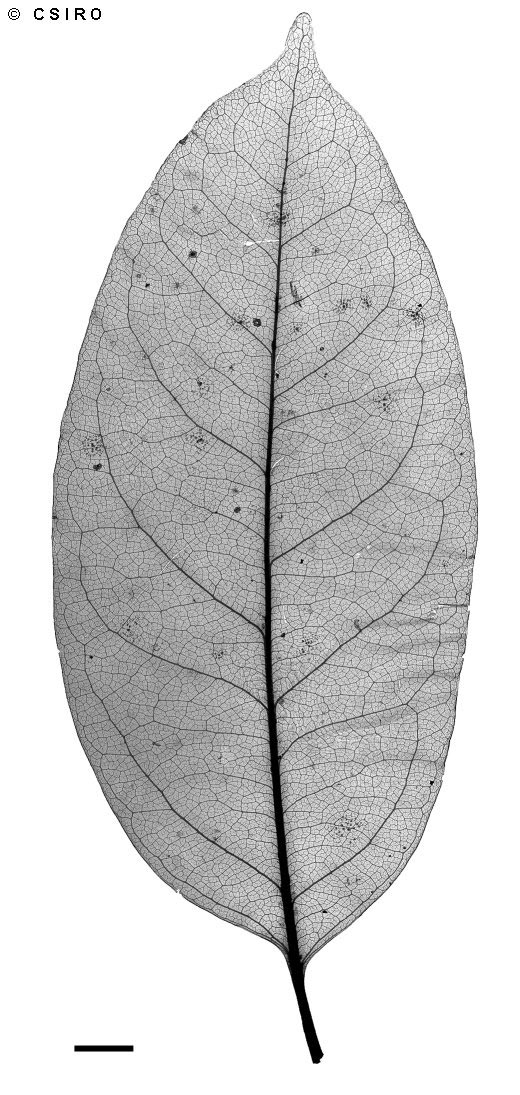
X-ray of leaf

Endiandra compressa, commonly known as whitebark or greenheart, is a rainforest tree in the Lauraceae family endemic to eastern Australia. It was first described in 1919 and has been given the conservation status of least concern.

== Description ==
Endiandra compressa is a tree reaching 20 m (66 ft) tall with a trunk diameter of 75 cm (30 in). Buttress roots are often present, particularly on larger trees. The bark is pale or light grey. The leaves are simple (i.e. undivided) and are arranged alternately on the twigs; they are glossy green and measure up to 25 cm (9.8 in) long and 9 cm (3.5 in) wide, with 10–12 pairs of lateral veins either side of the midrib. Fragrant, creamy yellow flowers are borne on short panicles in the leaf axils, and they are very small—the tepals are about 2 mm (0.1 in) wide and long.

The fruit is a drupe up to 7 cm (2.8 in) long and 4 cm (1.6 in) wide, black or bluish black in colour. It is mostly round, but laterally flattened (or compressed), hence the species name compressa, and it contains a single large seed about 5 cm (2.0 in) long by 3 cm (1.2 in) wide.

=== Phenology ===
Flowering occurs in the months of November to December, and fruit are seen from March to November.

== Taxonomy ==
The species was first described in 1919 by the Australian botanist Cyril Tenison White, based on material collected near Imbil in southeastern Queensland by F.H. Weatherhead. It was published in the Queensland government's then-named Department of Agriculture and Stock's Botany Bulletin under the title Contributions to the Queensland flora.

== Distribution and habitat ==
The natural distribution is from the Nambucca River in northeast New South Wales to Kutini-Payamu National Park, in Cape York Peninsula, Queensland. It grows in well developed rainforest on a variety of soil types, at altitudes from sea level to 450 m (1,480 ft) altitude.

== Conservation ==
As of November 2024, this species has been assessed to be of least concern by the International Union for Conservation of Nature and by the Queensland Government under its Nature Conservation Act.

== Ecology ==
The butterfly Chaetocneme porphyropis feeds on the leaves of this tree.
