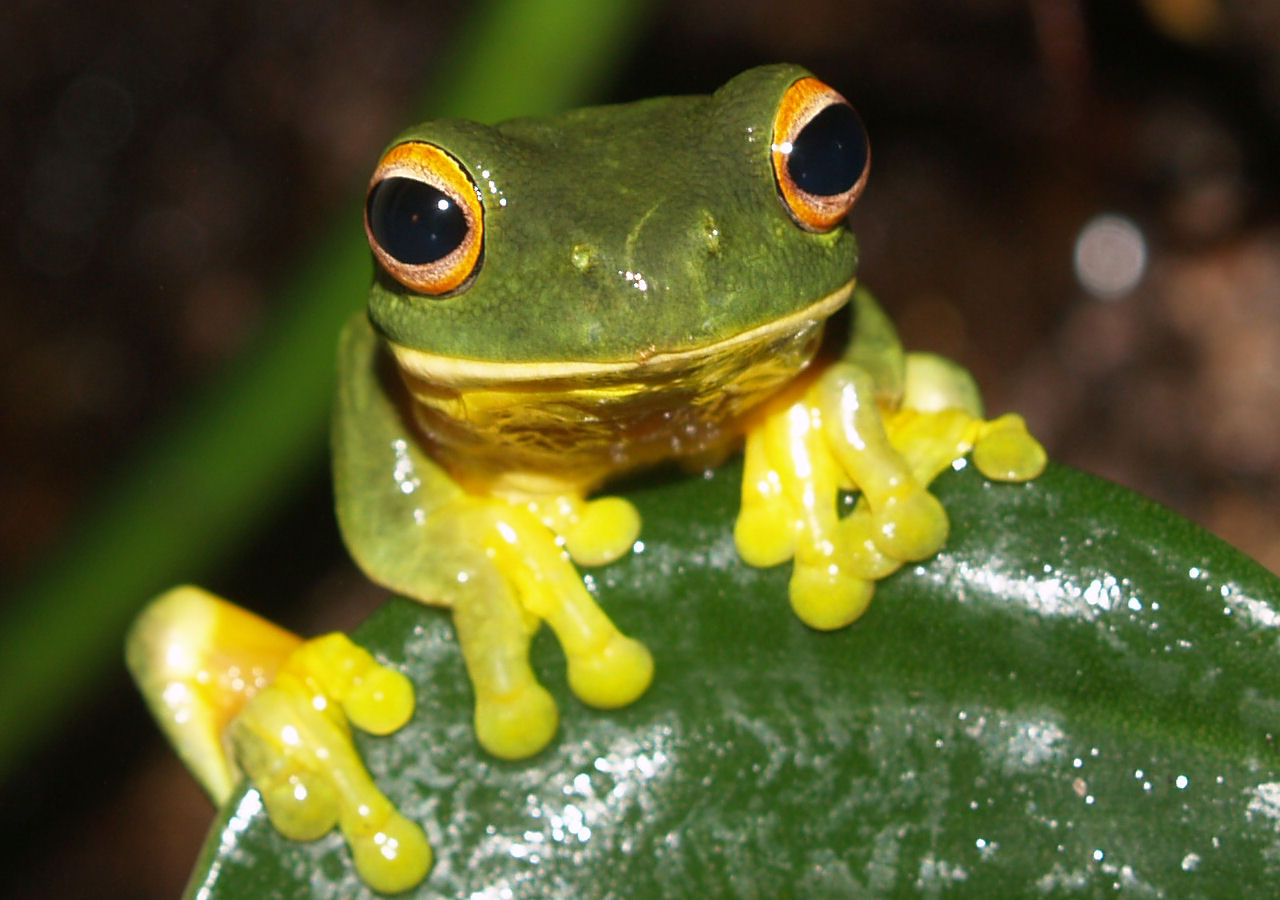

Conservation status
- Least Concern (IUCN 3.1)

Scientific classification
- Kingdom: Animalia
- Phylum: Chordata
- Class: Amphibia
- Order: Anura
- Family: Pelodryadidae
- Genus: Chlorohyla
- Species: C. xanthomera

Binomial name
- Chlorohyla xanthomera (Davies, McDonald, and Adams, 1986)
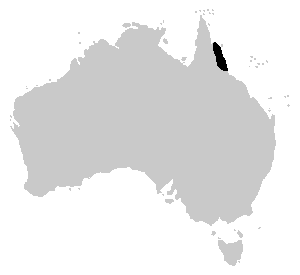
- Distribution of the orange-thighed frog

Synonyms
- Litoria xanthomera Davies, McDonald, and Adams, 1986; Ranoidea xanthomera

= Orange-thighed frog =

Species of amphibian

The orange-thighed frog (Chlorohyla xanthomera) is a species of tree frog native to a small area of tropical northern Queensland, Australia. It has been observed between 100 and 1500 meters above sea level. It is a green frog with distinctly orange eyes, and is very similar in appearance to the red-eyed tree frog.

== Description ==
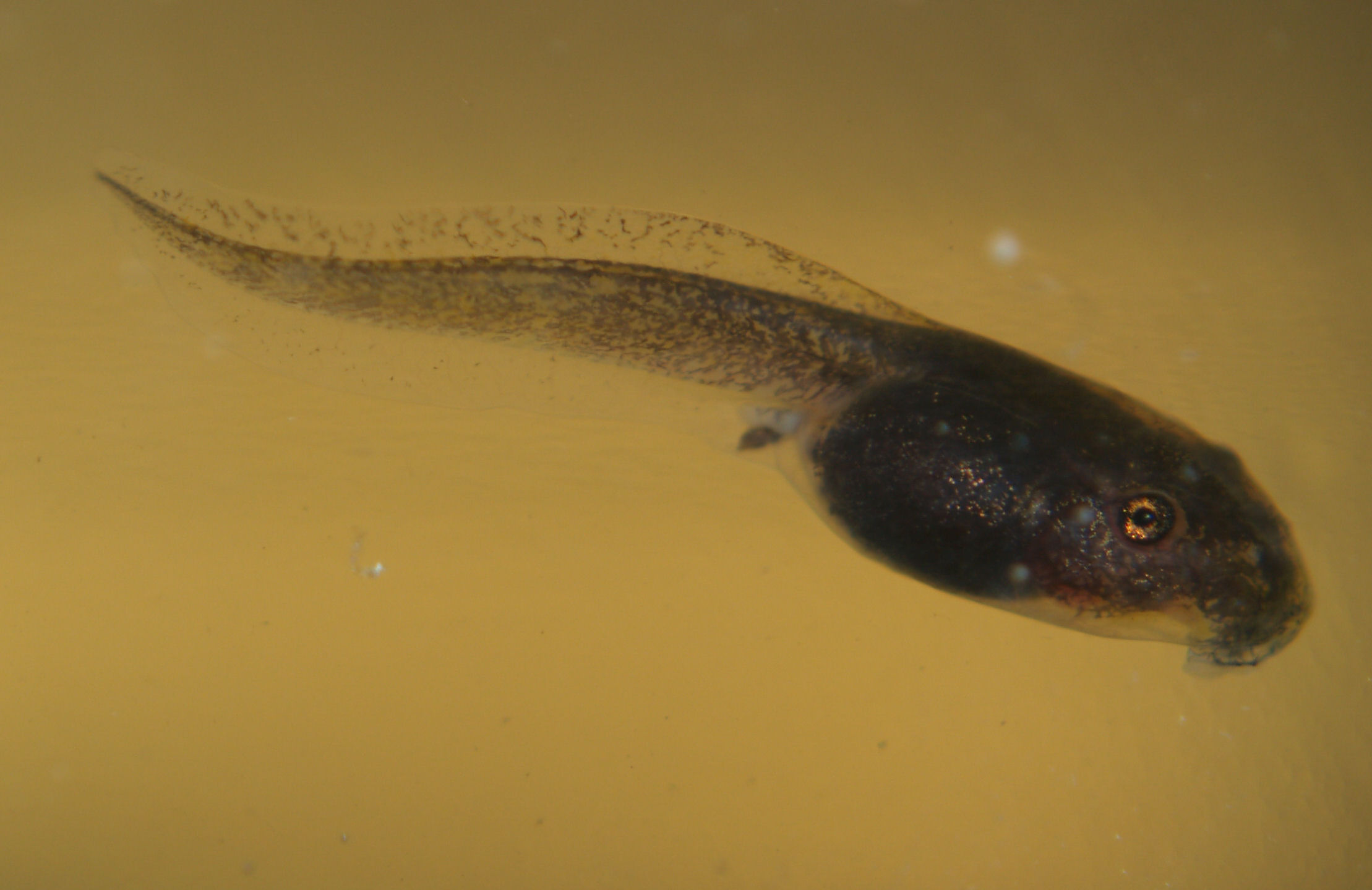
Tadpole of the orange-thighed frog

The orange-thighed frog is a medium-sized tree frog, reaching a snout-vent length of 56 mm (2.2 inches). It is a slender frog, with a thin body and flat head. The snout is rounded and truncated, leaving room in the skull for large eyes, which are orange in colour. It has a green dorsal surface which is weakly granular in texture. The granules are more obvious around the eyes and the head.

Males and females are visually identical, but females are often larger, ranging from 43–55 mm (1.7–2.2 in). Juveniles are cream to pale yellow while developing into adults.

The upperside of the body and exterior of the legs are uniformly bright or olive green, while the belly, vocal sac, feet and lower lips are bright yellow. This yellow colour extends to the inner hands and legs. The groin and interior of the thighs are most often deep orange, but can also match the rest of the belly.

It is distinguished, physically, from the other members of Pelodryadidae by its relatively large size, bright green color, and extensive finger webbing. It differs from the red-eyed tree frog by the orange coloring on the thighs; the red-eyed tree frog has mauve thighs.

== Ecology and behaviour ==
Orange-thighed frogs live in thick rainforests in Northern Queensland. The habitat is often centered around a slow moving pool, creek or pond. They have also been found at a disused quarry in the Queensland area.

Male orange-thighed frogs are explosive breeders, copulating in fast cycles during or after heavy rain. Males congregate around still ponds, and call from low branches, or the edges of the water. The call is a long "aaa-rk", followed by a soft trill. The males call in a large chorus; amplexus occurs where the frog calls, and the male and female move to the laying site. Researchers have found that smaller males have a higher percentage of success when mating because they can call for longer: their vocal cords require less energy to use than larger frogs due to both their size and the frequency of the call.

The eggs are brown, and are in masses of 800 to 1600. They are most often attached to submerged vegetation until the tadpoles hatch. The tadpoles are identical in appearance to those of the red-eyed tree frog.
