= Bollygum =

Bollygum may refer to a number of tree species:

- Beilschmiedia obtusifolia, hard bollygum
- Blepharocarya depauperata, North Queensland bollygum, northern bollygum
- Blepharocarya involucrigera, North Queensland bollygum, northern bollygum
- Dysoxylum schiffneri, hard bollygum
- Litsea breviumbellata, brown bollygum, soft bollygum
- Litsea fawcettiana, bollygum
- Litsea glutinosa, brown bollygum, soft bollygum
- Litsea leefeana, brown bollywood, soft bollygum, big-leaf bollywood
- Litsea reticulata, brown bollygum, soft bollygum
- Neolitsea australiensis, green bollygum
- Neolitsea cassia, smooth barbed bollygum
- Neolitsea dealbata, hairy-leaf bollygum, white bollygum

== See also ==
- Bollywood (tree)
