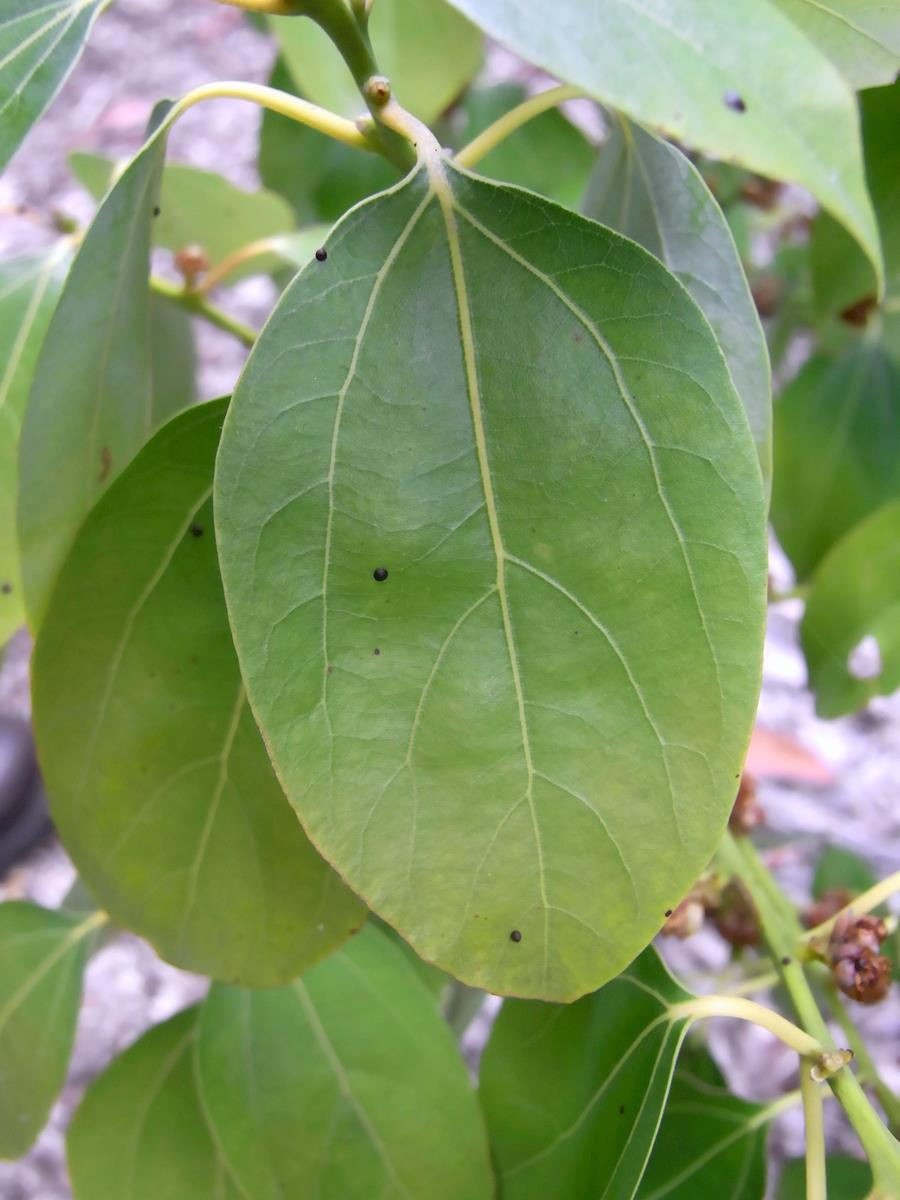
- juvenile leaves

Conservation status
- Least Concern (IUCN 3.1)

Scientific classification
- Kingdom: Plantae
- Clade: Tracheophytes
- Clade: Angiosperms
- Clade: Magnoliids
- Order: Laurales
- Family: Lauraceae
- Genus: Neolitsea
- Species: N. australiensis

Binomial name
- Neolitsea australiensis Kosterm.

= Neolitsea australiensis =

Green bolly gum

Species of tree

Neolitsea australiensis, also known as the green bolly gum, is an Australian rainforest tree, in the laurel family. The specific epithet is derived from "Australia", and the Latin "ensis"; meaning "native of Australia".

== Description ==
Usually seen from 6–15 m tall with a stem diameter of 25 cm. However, at Murray Scrub, it is 40 m tall with a trunk diameter of 50 cm. Bark is smooth and dark brown on a cylindrical trunk.

=== Leaves ===
Leaves are pointed; ovate to elliptic in shape, 6 to 13 cm long, 2 to 6 cm wide. Glossy above and pale grey below. The leaf stem is green, between 12 and 20 mm long. Leaf veins are prominent, with three to five lateral veins. The basal pair of veins starts around 5 mm from the leaf base. And travels for about half the leaf length in a curve. Twigs are smooth, either brown or green.

=== Flowers and fruit ===
Scented cream flowers form in stalk-less clusters from March to September. The fruit are larger than those of Neolitsea dealbata, 20 mm long and 14 mm wide, the seed is pointed, around 10 mm long. The fruit is eaten by a variety of birds, including green catbird, regent bowerbird, satin bowerbird, topknot pigeon and white-headed pigeon. Removal of the black aril is advised for propagation by seed.

== Distribution ==
The species is an under-storey tree found in rainforests in New South Wales and Queensland, north from Ourimbah to near Maryborough, Queensland. Often found on the better more fertile alluvial or volcanic soils. In the field it may be difficult to distinguish between the similar Cryptocarya rigida and Neolitsea dealbata.

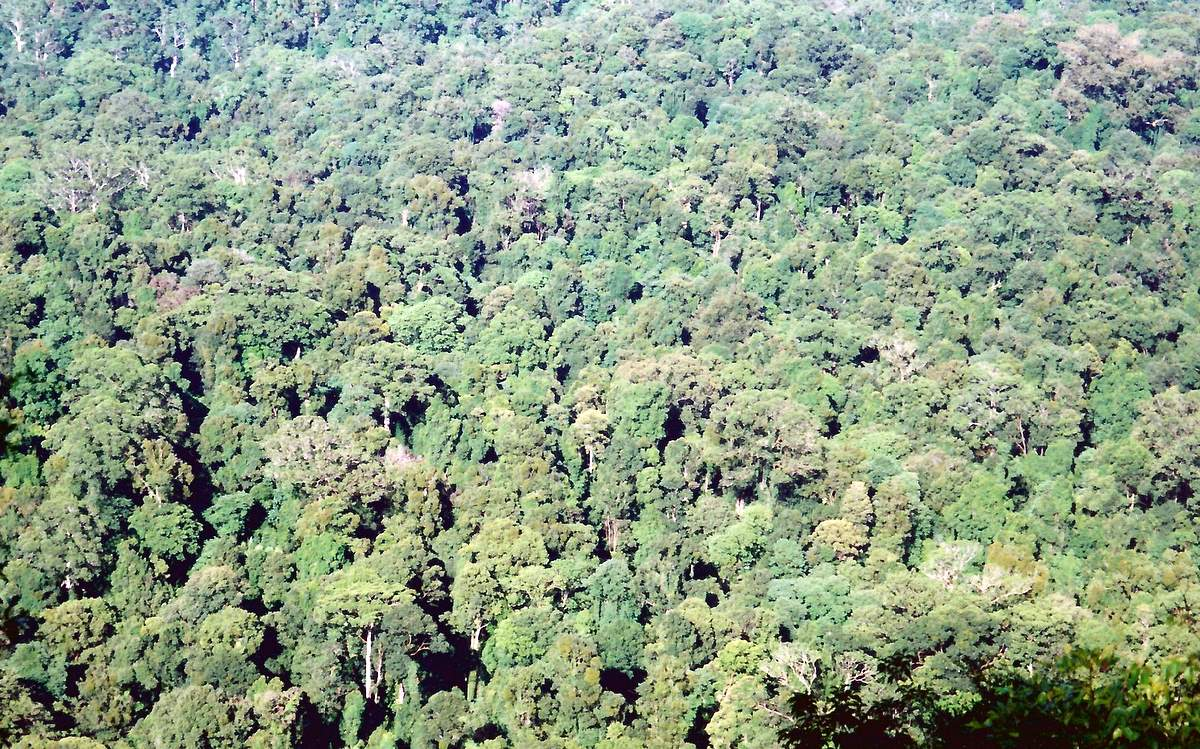
The green bollygum is a large tree in the tall rainforest at Murray Scrub, Australia
