= Rose maple =

Rose maple is a common name for several flowering plants in the family Lauraceae, in a different family and order from true maples, and may refer to:

- Cryptocarya erythroxylon
- Cryptocarya rigida
