= Black Bulga State Conservation Area =

Protected area in New South Wales, Australia

- IUCN category Ia (strict nature reserve)
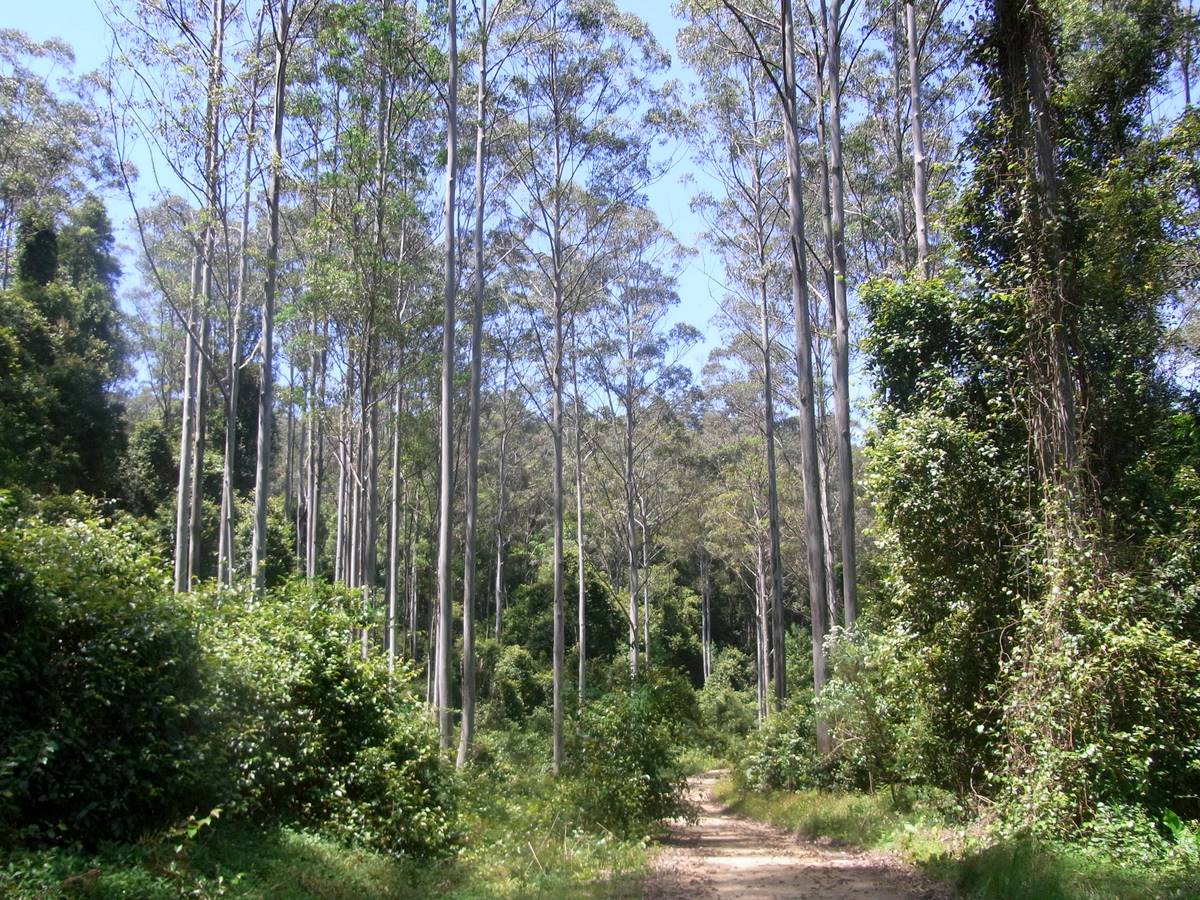
- Sydney blue gum regeneration in the conservation area

- Location within New South Wales
- Location: New South Wales
- Nearest city: Dungog
- Coordinates: 32°16.8255′S 151°48.75144′E
- Area: 15.54 km^{2} (6.00 sq mi)
- Established: 2003
- Governing body: NSW National Parks & Wildlife Service
- Website: https://www.environment.nsw.gov.au/NationalParks/parkHome.aspx?id=N0692

The Black Bulga State Conservation Area is a protected conservation area located near the Barrington Tops, in the Hunter Region of New South Wales, Australia. The 1,554-hectare (3,840-acre) conservation area is situated 16 kilometres (9.9 mi) from Dungog, and used to be part of Trevor State Forest and Chichester State Forest.

== Features ==
In 2013 the status of this park as a State Conservation Area was threatened by a Government of New South Wales recommendation to allow logging in national parks. The Black Bulga Range Action Group (a group of local residents and concerned individuals who helped the park to be converted to State Conservation Area in 2003) worked to successfully ensure the continued protection of this unique bushland area.

Flora includes wet sclerophyll eucalyptus forest. This area was logged for trees such as Sydney blue gum, tallowwood, white mahogany and spotted gum. Rainforest tree species include Australian red cedar, scentless rosewood, native tamarind, citronella and rose maple. Tall grass trees grow at higher altitudes.

Koalas, eastern grey kangaroos, red-necked wallabies and greater gliders are some of the many marsupial animals found here.

== See also ==
- Protected areas of New South Wales
