= Neolitsea kedahensis =

Conservation status
- Endangered (IUCN 3.1)

Scientific classification
- Kingdom: Plantae
- Clade: Tracheophytes
- Clade: Angiosperms
- Clade: Magnoliids
- Order: Laurales
- Family: Lauraceae
- Genus: Neolitsea
- Species: N. kedahensis

Binomial name
- Neolitsea kedahensis (Gamble) Gamble

Synonyms
- Tetradenia kedahensis Gamble

Species of tree

Neolitsea kedahensis is a species of tree in the family Lauraceae. It is endemic to Kedah (hence the specific epithet kedahensis) in Peninsular Malaysia. The IUCN Red List assesses the species as Endangered.
