= Neolitsea fuscata =

Scientific classification
- Kingdom: Plantae
- Clade: Tracheophytes
- Clade: Angiosperms
- Clade: Magnoliids
- Order: Laurales
- Family: Lauraceae
- Genus: Neolitsea
- Species: N. fuscata

Binomial name
- Neolitsea fuscata (Thwaites) Alston

Species of tree

Neolitsea fuscata is a species of tree in the family Lauraceae. It is endemic to the Sri Lanka. The name is still in debate to accept as a separate species.
