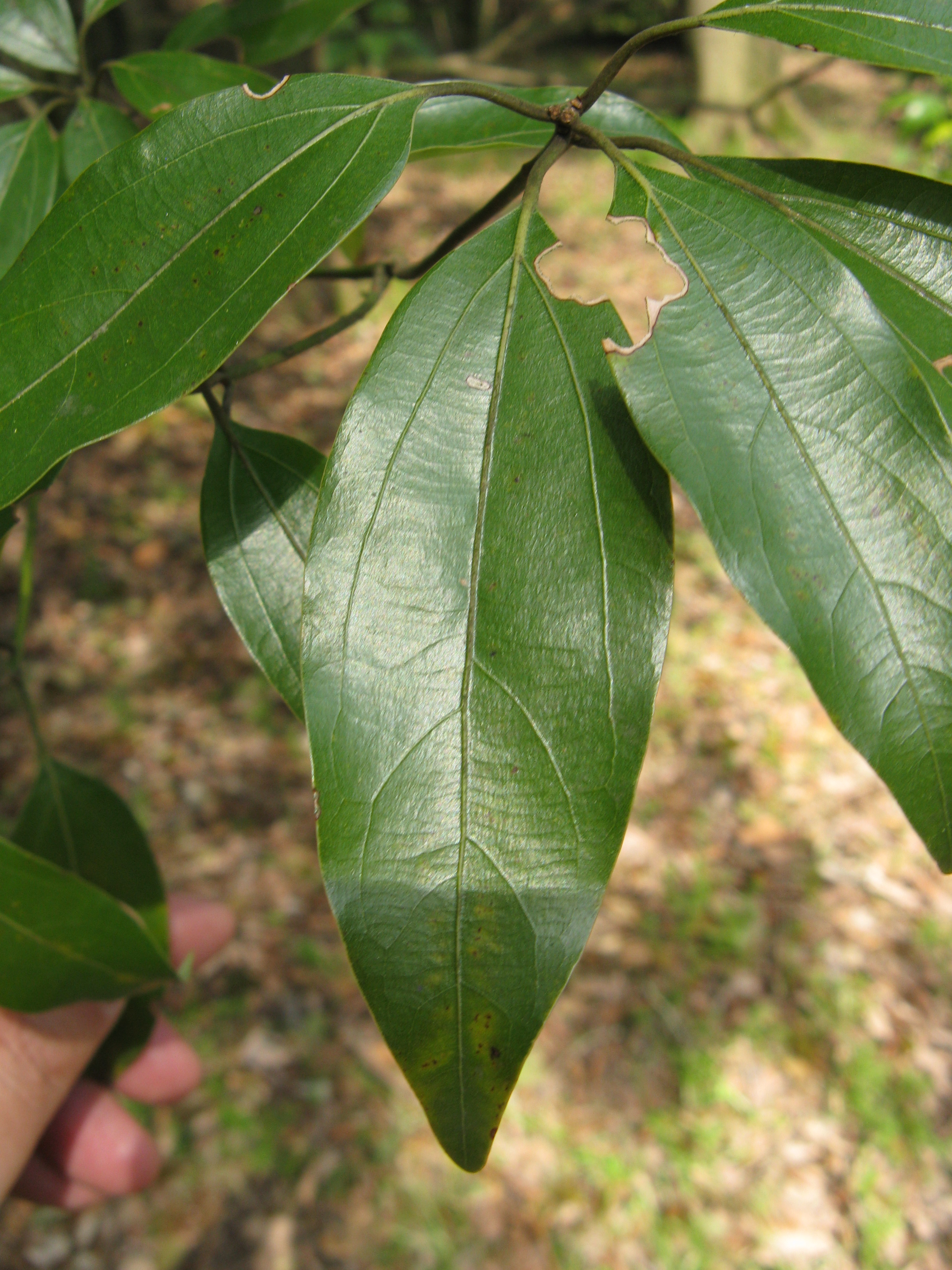

Scientific classification
- Kingdom: Plantae
- Clade: Tracheophytes
- Clade: Angiosperms
- Clade: Magnoliids
- Order: Laurales
- Family: Lauraceae
- Genus: Neolitsea
- Species: N. aciculata

Binomial name
- Neolitsea aciculata (Blume) Koidzumi

= Neolitsea aciculata =

Species of tree

Neolitsea aciculata is a species of small evergreen tree (trunk up to 4 m (13 ft)) in the family Lauraceae. It is found in Japan and Taiwan. In Taiwan, it grows often in mixed coniferous and broad-leaved forests in valleys throughout the island.

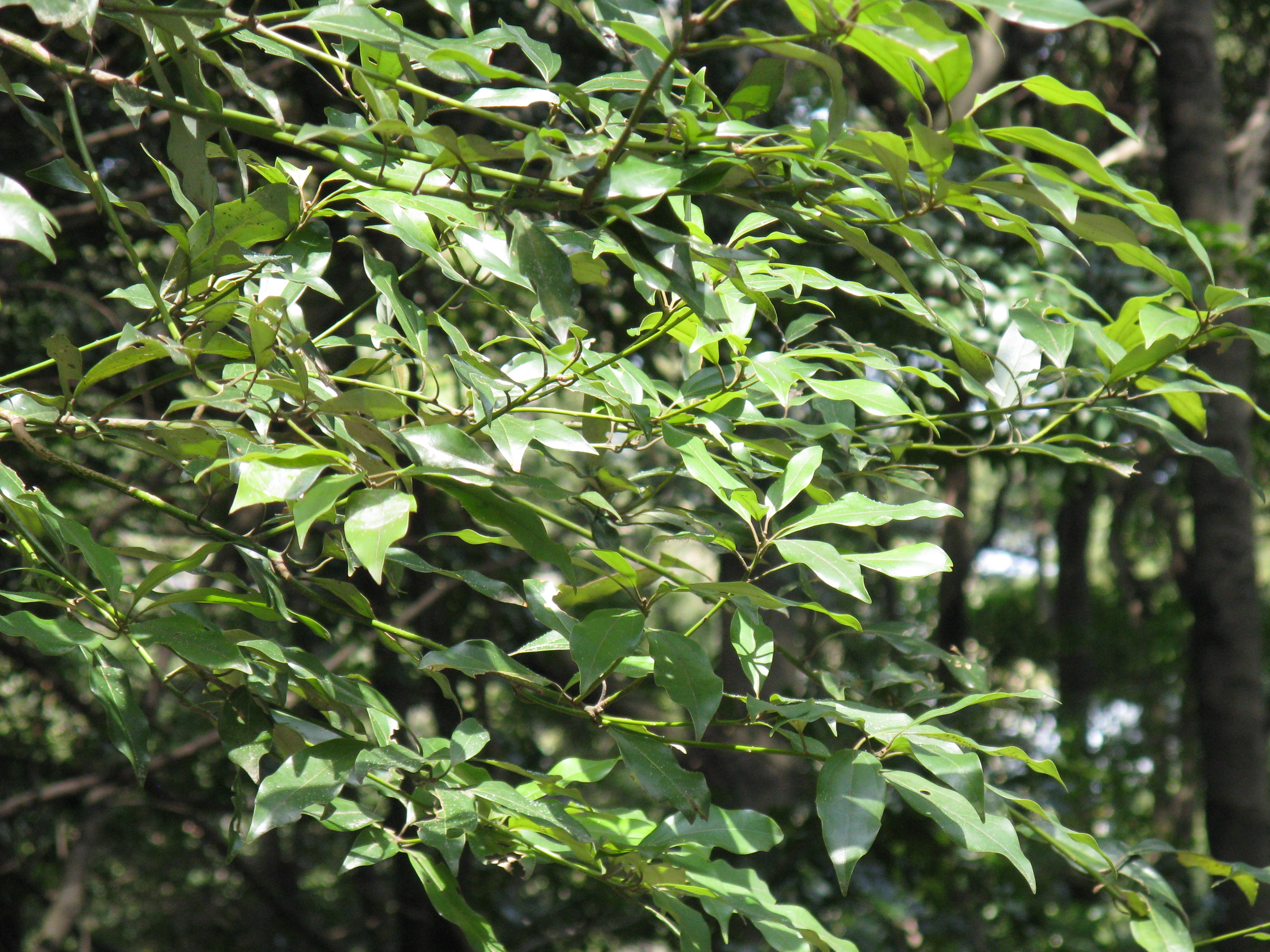
N. aciculata foliage

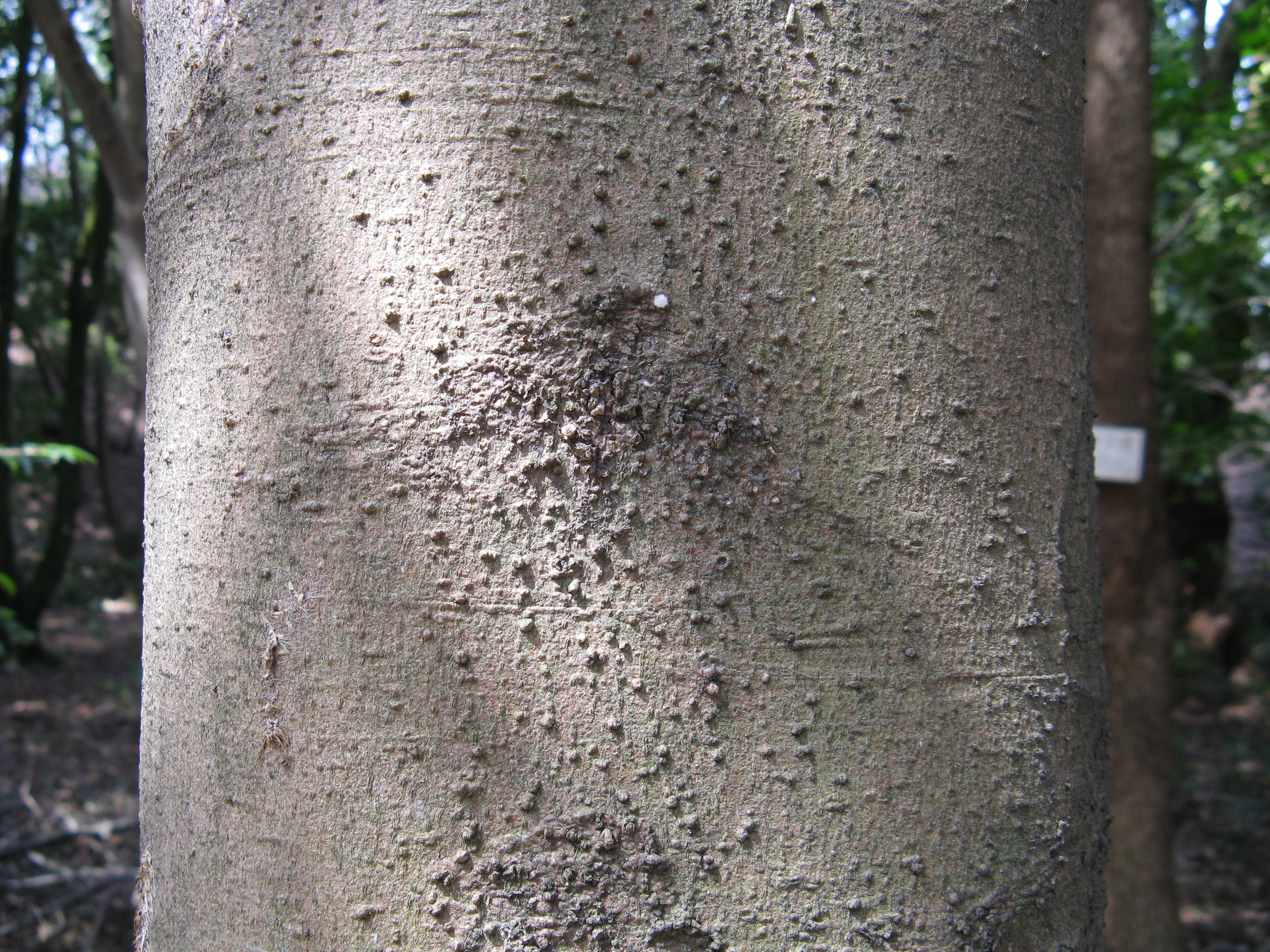
N. aciculata trunk
