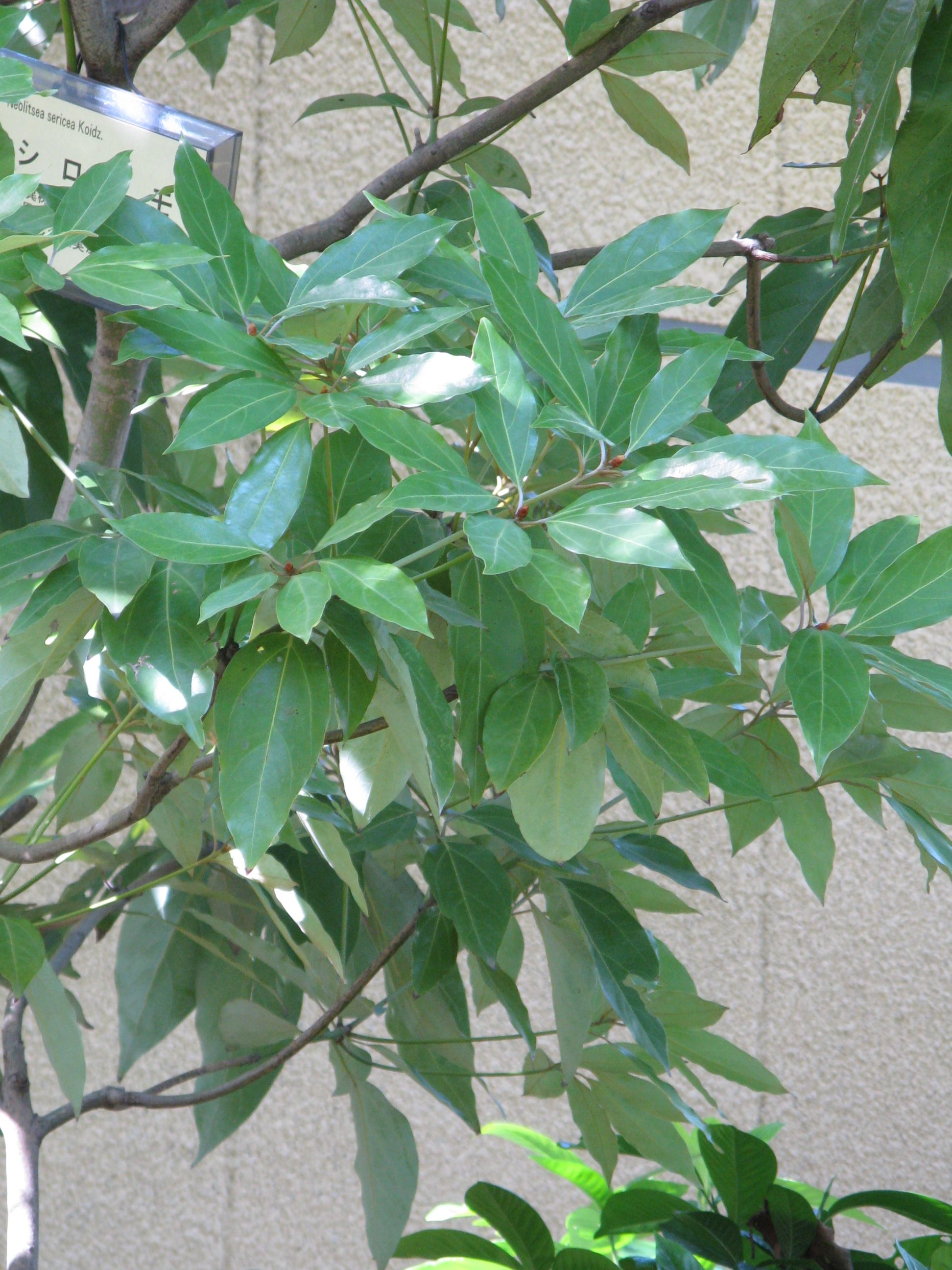
- Neolitsea sericea

Scientific classification
- Kingdom: Plantae
- Clade: Embryophytes
- Clade: Tracheophytes
- Clade: Spermatophytes
- Clade: Angiosperms
- Clade: Magnoliids
- Order: Laurales
- Family: Lauraceae
- Genus: Neolitsea (Benth. & Hook.f.) Merr.

Species
- See text

Synonyms
- Bryantea Raf.; Hornera Jungh.; Tetradenia Nees

= Neolitsea =

Genus of shrubs

Neolitsea is a genus of about 85 species of evergreen shrubs and small trees in the laurel family Lauraceae. They range from Indo-Malaysia to East Asia to Australia. The leaves are alternate, clustered, or verticillate, rarely subopposite. Species are dioecious, with separate male and female plants.

The Australian species, of which there are three, are commonly known as bolly gums and are fairly common in the rainforests of the east.

Many species of the genus Neolitsea have been analysed for essential oils and their biological activity. In the Philippines, bark extracts of Neolitsea villosa are mixed with honey or sugarcane juice and fermented into alcoholic drinks like kabarawan and intus.

== Species ==
98 species are accepted.

- Neolitsea aciculata (Blume) Koidz. – a small tree; Japan, Taiwan
- Neolitsea acuminatissima (Hayata) Kaneh. & Sasaki
- Neolitsea acuta (Teschner) Kamik.
- Neolitsea alongensis Lecomte
- Neolitsea amabilis Airy Shaw
- Neolitsea amboinensis Merr.
- Neolitsea andamanica Kosterm.
- Neolitsea angustifolia A.Chev.
- Neolitsea archboldiana C.K.Allen
- Neolitsea arfakensis Kaneh. & Hatus.
- Neolitsea aurata (Hayata) Koidz.
- Neolitsea aureosericea Kosterm.
- Neolitsea auricolor (Kosterm.) Kosterm.
- Neolitsea australiensis Kosterm. – Australia, Green bolly gum
- Neolitsea bawangensis R.H.Miao
- Neolitsea bidoupensis Yahara & Tagane
- Neolitsea boninensis Koidz.
- Neolitsea brassii C.K.Allen
- Neolitsea brevipes H.W.Li
- Neolitsea buisanensis Yamam. & Kamik.
- Neolitsea cassia (L.) Kosterm. – Sri Lanka
- Neolitsea cassiifolia (Blume) Merr.
- Neolitsea chrysotricha H.W.Li
- Neolitsea chunii Merr. –tree up to 18m, southern China
- Neolitsea cinnamomea (Ridl.) Kosterm.
- Neolitsea coccinea B.C.Stone
- Neolitsea confertifolia (Hemsl.) Merr.
- Neolitsea cuipala (D.Don) Kosterm.
- Neolitsea daibuensis Kamik. – a small tree; Taiwan
- Neolitsea dealbata (R.Br.) Merr. – Australia, tree up to 12m, Hairy-leaved bolly gum
- Neolitsea elaeocarpa H.Liu
- Neolitsea ellipsoidea C.K.Allen
- Neolitsea fischeri Gamble – India
- Neolitsea foliosa (Nees) Gamble
- Neolitsea formosa S.Moore
- Neolitsea fuscata (Thwaites) Alston – Sri Lanka (unresolved name)
- Neolitsea gamblei Chakrab. & Diwakar
- Neolitsea gilva Koidz.
- Neolitsea glabra (Teschner) Kamik.
- Neolitsea hainanensis Yen C.Yang & P.H.Huang
- Neolitsea hiiranensis Tang S.Liu & J.C.Liao
- Neolitsea homilantha C.K.Allen
- Neolitsea hongiaoensis Yahara & Tagane
- Neolitsea hongkongensis (Chun) C.K.Allen – Hong Kong
- Neolitsea howii C.K.Allen
- Neolitsea hsiangkweiensis Yen C.Yang & P.H.Huang
- Neolitsea impressa Yen C.Yang
- Neolitsea incana Elmer
- Neolitsea javanica (Blume) Backer
- Neolitsea kedahensis (Gamble) Gamble – Malaysia
- Neolitsea konishii (Hayata) Kaneh. & Sasaki
- Neolitsea kraduengensis Tagane & Yahara
- Neolitsea kwangsiensis H.Liu
- Neolitsea lancifolia (Thwaites) Kosterm.
- Neolitsea latifolia (Blume) S.Moore
- Neolitsea levinei Merr.
- Neolitsea longifolia (Teschner) Kamik.
- Neolitsea longipedicellata Yen C.Yang & P.H.Huang
- Neolitsea lunglingensis H.W.Li
- Neolitsea mannii (King ex Hook.f.) Chakrab.
- Neolitsea megacarpa Merr.
- Neolitsea menglaensis Yen C.Yang & P.H.Huang
- Neolitsea microphylla Merr.
- Neolitsea minor (Teschner) Kamik.
- Neolitsea mollissima (Gamble) Gamble – Malaysia
- Neolitsea novoguinensis (Teschner) Kamik.
- Neolitsea oblongifolia Merr. & Chun
- Neolitsea obtusifolia Merr.
- Neolitsea ovatifolia Yen C.Yang & P.H.Huang
- Neolitsea pallens (D.Don) Momiy. & H.Hara
- Neolitsea papuana Merr.
- Neolitsea parvigemma (Hayata) Kaneh. & Sasaki – a small tree; Taiwan
- Neolitsea paucinervia Merr.
- Neolitsea phanerophlebia Merr.
- Neolitsea pingbienensis Yen C.Yang & P.H.Huang
- Neolitsea pinninervis Yen C.Yang & P.H.Huang
- Neolitsea poilanei H.Liu
- Neolitsea polycarpa H.Liu
- Neolitsea pubescens (Teschner) Kamik.
- Neolitsea pulchella (Meisn.) Merr.
- Neolitsea purpurescens Yen C.Yang
- Neolitsea reticulata Kosterm.
- Neolitsea sanjappae M.K.Pathak, Bhaumik & Chakrab.
- Neolitsea sericea (Blume) Koidz. – tree up to 15m; Japan, Korea, Taiwan, China
- Neolitsea shingningensis Yen C.Yang & P.H.Huang
- Neolitsea siamensis Kosterm.
- Neolitsea sutchuanensis Yen C.Yang
- Neolitsea teschneriana C.K.Allen
- Neolitsea tomentosa H.W.Li
- Neolitsea triplinervia (Blume) Merr.
- Neolitsea umbrosa (Nees) Gamble
- Neolitsea undulatifolia (H.Lév.) C.K.Allen
- Neolitsea variabillima (Hayata) Kaneh. & Sasaki
- Neolitsea velutina W.T.Wang
- Neolitsea villosa (Blume) Merr.
- Neolitsea vuquangensis Mitsuyuki & Yahara
- Neolitsea wushanica (Chun) Merr.
- Neolitsea zeylanica (Nees & T.Nees) Merr.

=== Formerly placed here ===
- Actinodaphne multiflora Benth. (as Neolitsea vidalii Merr.)
