= Neolitsea daibuensis =

Conservation status
- Near Threatened (IUCN 3.1)

Scientific classification
- Kingdom: Plantae
- Clade: Tracheophytes
- Clade: Angiosperms
- Clade: Magnoliids
- Order: Laurales
- Family: Lauraceae
- Genus: Neolitsea
- Species: N. daibuensis

Binomial name
- Neolitsea daibuensis Kamik.

Species of tree

Neolitsea daibuensis is a species of plant in the family Lauraceae endemic to Taiwan. It is a small semi-deciduous tree that grows in the broad-leaved forests in southern Taiwan at elevations of 800–1,000 m (2,600–3,300 ft). It is threatened by habitat loss.
