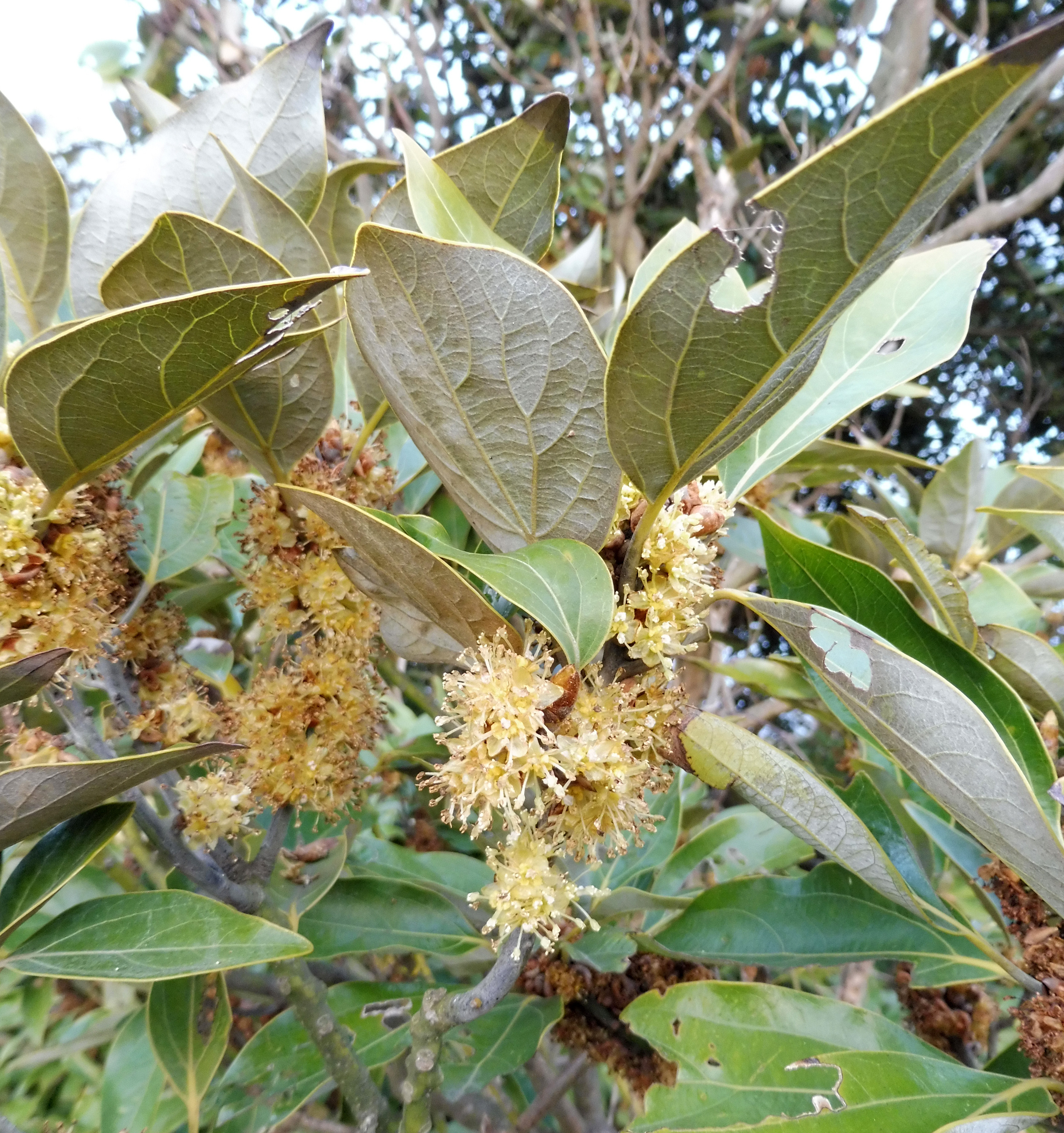

Conservation status
- Least Concern (IUCN 3.1)

Scientific classification
- Kingdom: Plantae
- Clade: Embryophytes
- Clade: Tracheophytes
- Clade: Spermatophytes
- Clade: Angiosperms
- Clade: Magnoliids
- Order: Laurales
- Family: Lauraceae
- Genus: Neolitsea
- Species: N. sericea

Binomial name
- Neolitsea sericea (Blume) Koidz.

Synonyms
- List: Laurus sericea Blume; Cinnamomum glaucum J.Presl; Camphora glauca G.Don; Malapoenna sieboldii Kuntze; Litsea glauca var. xanthocarpa Makino; Litsea sieboldii Tanaka; Neolitsea sieboldii (Kuntze) Nakai; Neolitsea sieboldii var. prematura Nakai; Neolitsea sieboldii var. xanthocarpa Nakai; Neolitsea cuneifolia Koidz.; Neolitsea ohbana Koidz.; Tetradenia cuneifolia (Koidz.) Makino & Nemoto; Tetradenia glauca var. prematura (Nakai) Makino & Nemoto; Tetradenia glauca var. xanthocarpa (Nakai) Makino & Nemoto; Tetradenia ohbana (Koidz.) Makino & Nemoto; Neolitsea sericea var. angustifolia Hirai; Neolitsea sieboldii var. angustifolia (Hirai) Honda; Neolitsea sericea var. angustifolia Nakai; Neolitsea sericea f. xanthocarpa (Nakai) Okuyama; Neolitsea sericea var. prematura (Nakai) Honda; Neolitsea sericea f. angustifolia (Hirai) Satomi; Neolitsea sericea var. argentea Hatus. ex H.Ohba

= Neolitsea sericea =

Species of tree

Neolitsea sericea is a species of tree in the family Lauraceae. It is found in southeastern China (Zhejiang), Taiwan (Orchid Island, Green Island), south Korea, Japan, and the Ryukyu Islands. Its natural habitat is on forest margins and slopes, and it is often found in well-progressed secondary forests.

It is a medium-size tree, growing up to 10 m (33 ft) tall. Its leaves are evergreen, and distinctly whitened on the back. It produces yellow flowers in the fall, and its fruit is a red berry. It is hardy WHZ 8.

Neolitsea sericea contains two varieties, Neolitsea sericea var. sericea and Neolitsea sericea var. aurata. The latter may also be considered as its own species, Neolitsea aurata.

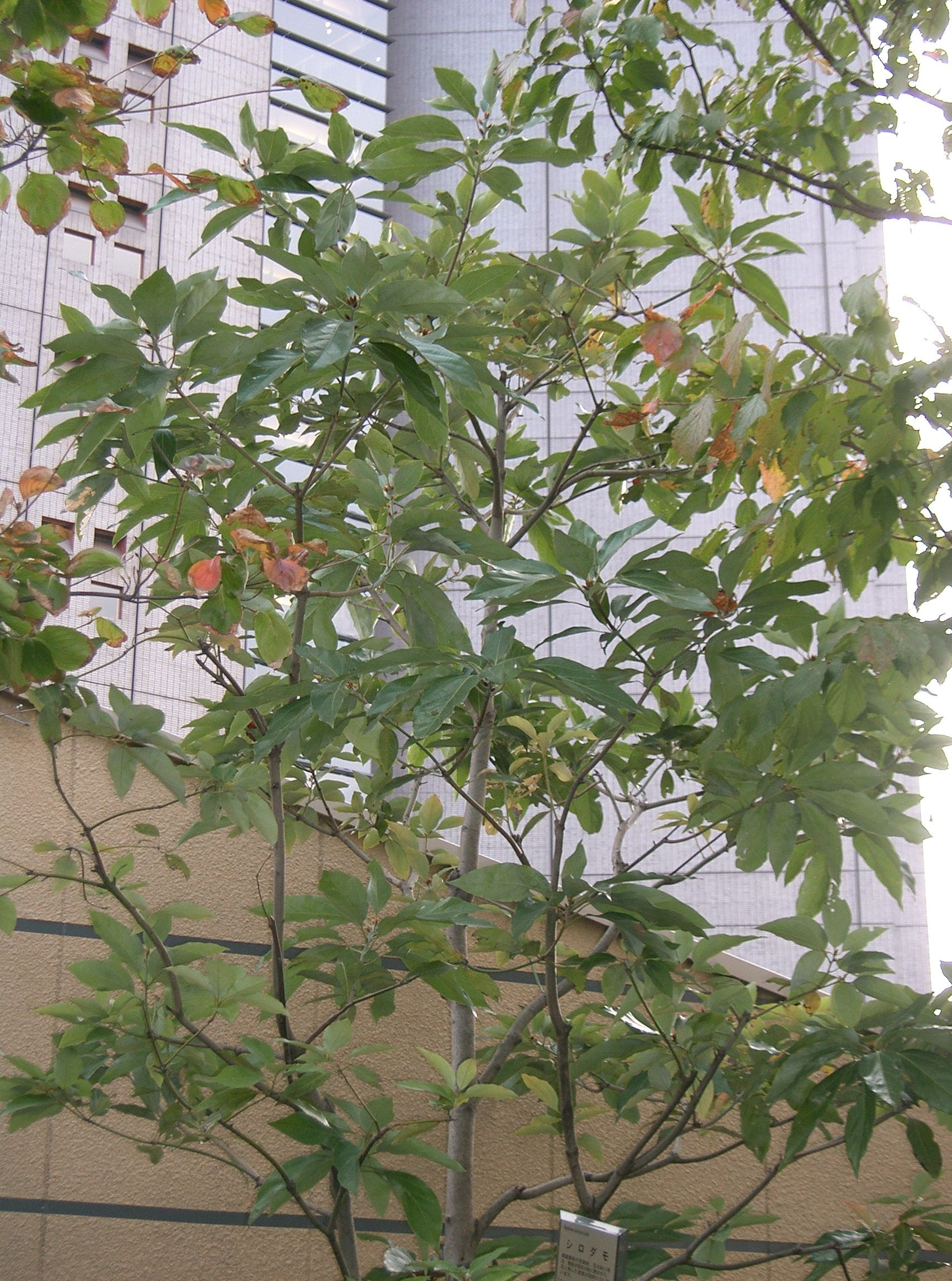
N. sericea

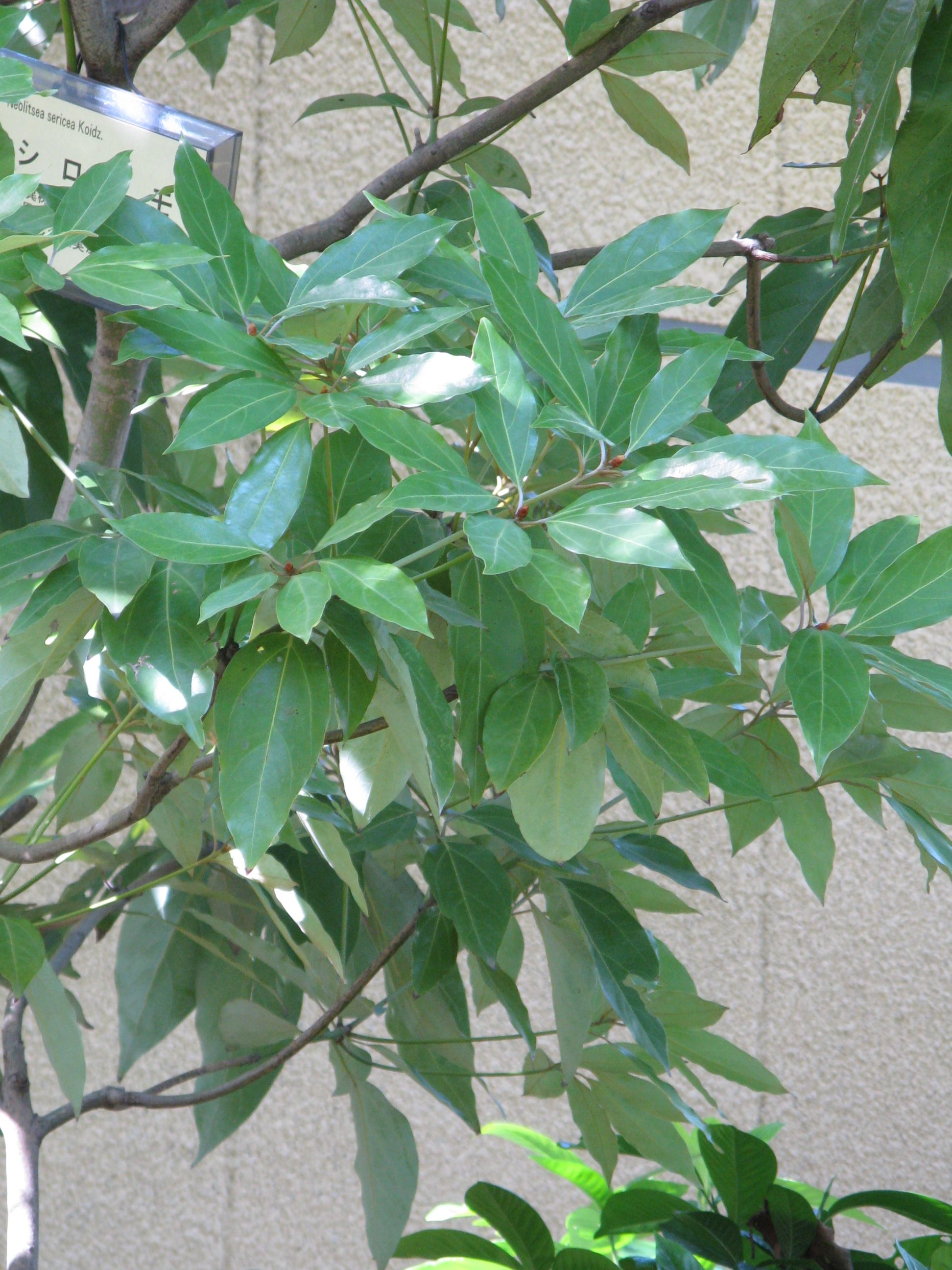
N. sericea leaves
