= Neolitsea mollissima =

Conservation status
- Vulnerable (IUCN 3.1)

Scientific classification
- Kingdom: Plantae
- Clade: Tracheophytes
- Clade: Angiosperms
- Clade: Magnoliids
- Order: Laurales
- Family: Lauraceae
- Genus: Neolitsea
- Species: N. mollissima

Binomial name
- Neolitsea mollissima (Gamble) Gamble

Synonyms
- Tetradenia mollissima Gamble

Species of tree

Neolitsea mollissima is a species of tree in the family Lauraceae. It is known from a single collection; it is endemic to Perak in Peninsular Malaysia.
