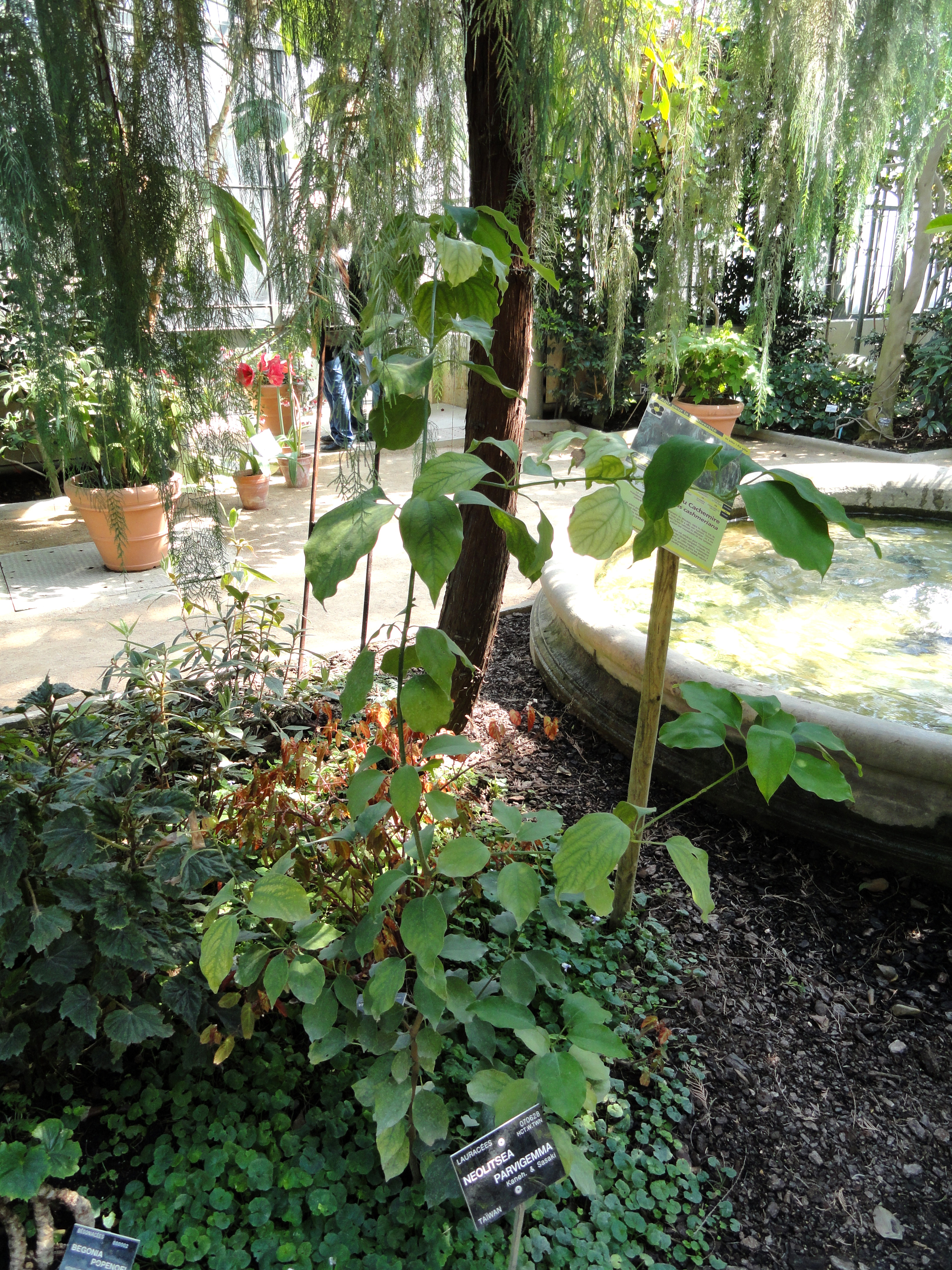

Conservation status
- Least Concern (IUCN 3.1)

Scientific classification
- Kingdom: Plantae
- Clade: Embryophytes
- Clade: Tracheophytes
- Clade: Spermatophytes
- Clade: Angiosperms
- Clade: Magnoliids
- Order: Laurales
- Family: Lauraceae
- Genus: Neolitsea
- Species: N. parvigemma

Binomial name
- Neolitsea parvigemma (Hayata) Kanehira & Sasaki

Synonyms
- Tetradenia parvigemma Hayata

= Neolitsea parvigemma =

Species of plant

Neolitsea parvigemma is a species of small to medium-sized tree in the family Lauraceae. It is endemic to Taiwan, and confined to the south central mountain regions of the island.

A number of chemicals from N. parvigemma show interesting biological properties. The hydrodistillated leaf essential oil of N. parvigemma has antifungal and anti-wood-decay fungal properties Sesquiterpenes isolated from the stems have anti-inflammatory properties.
