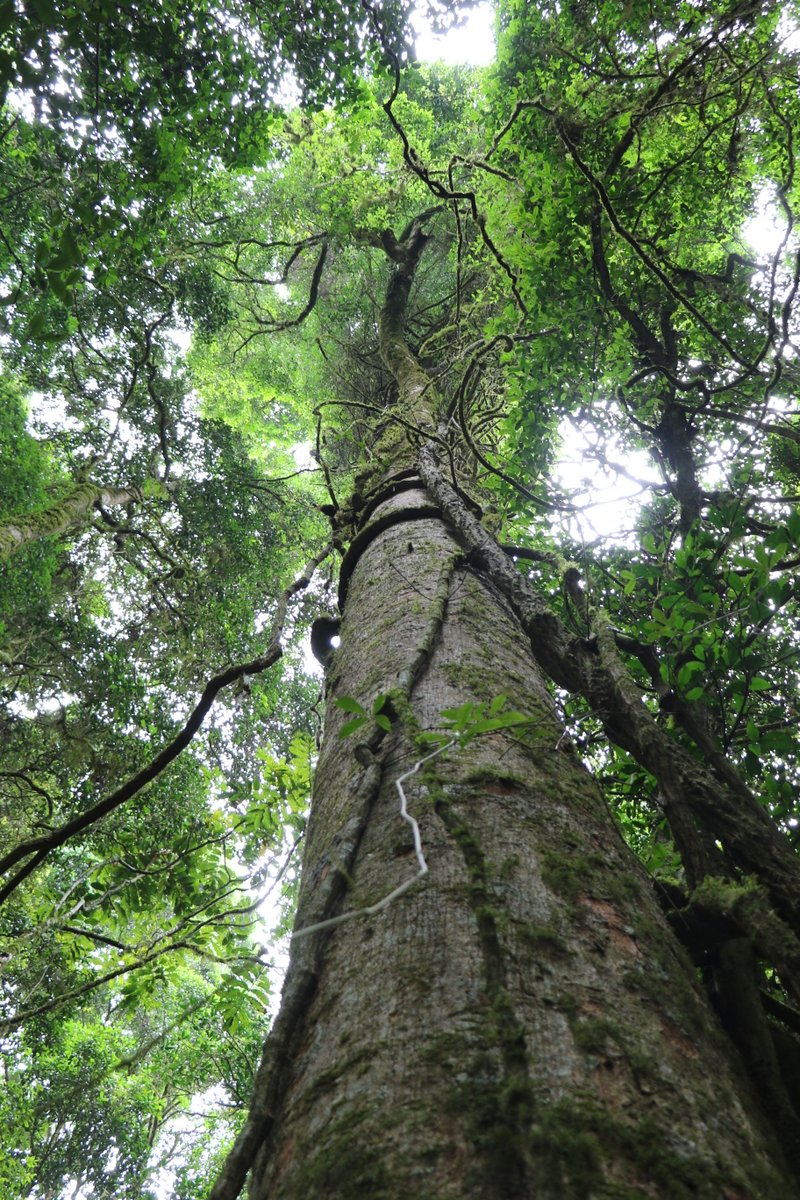
- Large tree at Tooloom scrub

Conservation status
- Least Concern (IUCN 3.1)

Scientific classification
- Kingdom: Plantae
- Clade: Tracheophytes
- Clade: Angiosperms
- Clade: Magnoliids
- Order: Laurales
- Family: Lauraceae
- Genus: Beilschmiedia
- Species: B. obtusifolia

Binomial name
- Beilschmiedia obtusifolia F.Muell. ex Meissner.

Synonyms
- Cryptocarya obtusifolia F.Muell. ex Meisn. (1864); Nesodaphne obtusifolia (F.Muell. ex Meisn.) Benth.

= Beilschmiedia obtusifolia =

Species of tree

Beilschmiedia obtusifolia is a rainforest tree in the laurel family Lauraceae, found in rainforests of eastern Australia. In Australia it ranges from Port Macquarie in New South Wales northwards to Cape York Peninsula in Queensland, within tropical and subtropical rainforests, usually on the more fertile basaltic sites, but sometimes close to the sea. Its common names include blush walnut, hard bolly gum, and nut wood.

== Description ==
Beilschmiedia obtusifolia is a medium to large tree. The cylindrical trunk is brown or creamy with vertical lines of raised pustules. The trunk features scales with round depressions, colloquially known as "bollies", similar to the related bollygum, Litsea reticulata. The tree's base is flanged in larger specimens.

The shoots and stems are hairy. The elliptic or reverse lanceolate leaves are alternate and not toothed, 8 to 10 cm long and 2 to 4 cm wide. They are bluntly pointed or sometimes notched at the tip. The leaf stalks are 5 mm long. Leaf venation is prominent on both sides, with a raised midrib.

Cream flowers form in panicles from October to November, and the flowers have an unpleasant scent. The fruit ripens from December to July, being a black egg-shaped drupe with a scented green oily aril. The fruit is 20 to 30 mm long with a single seed inside. As with most Australian laurels, removal of the fleshy aril is advised to assist seed germination, which is slow but fairly reliable with Beilschmiedia obtusifolia.

The fruits are eaten by a variety of birds, including the pied imperial pigeon, rose-crowned fruit dove, topknot pigeon, wompoo fruit dove, metallic starling, Australasian figbird, magnificent riflebird, bowerbird, and spotted catbird.

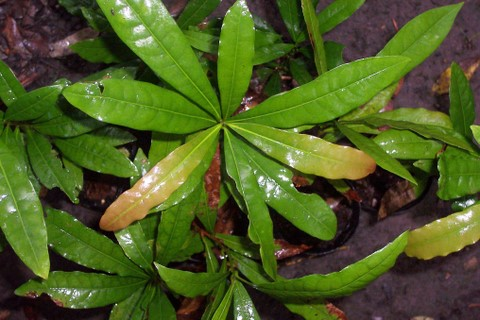
Juvenile foliage
