= Neolitsea fischeri =

Conservation status
- Vulnerable (IUCN 3.1)

Scientific classification
- Kingdom: Plantae
- Clade: Tracheophytes
- Clade: Angiosperms
- Clade: Magnoliids
- Order: Laurales
- Family: Lauraceae
- Genus: Neolitsea
- Species: N. fischeri

Binomial name
- Neolitsea fischeri Gamble

Species of tree

Neolitsea fischeri is a species of plant in the family Lauraceae. It is a small tree endemic to the Anaimalai and Palni Hills in southern India.

The essential oils from the leaves, bark and fruits of Neolitsea fischeri have been characterized and shown to possess moderate to good activity against certain bacteria.
