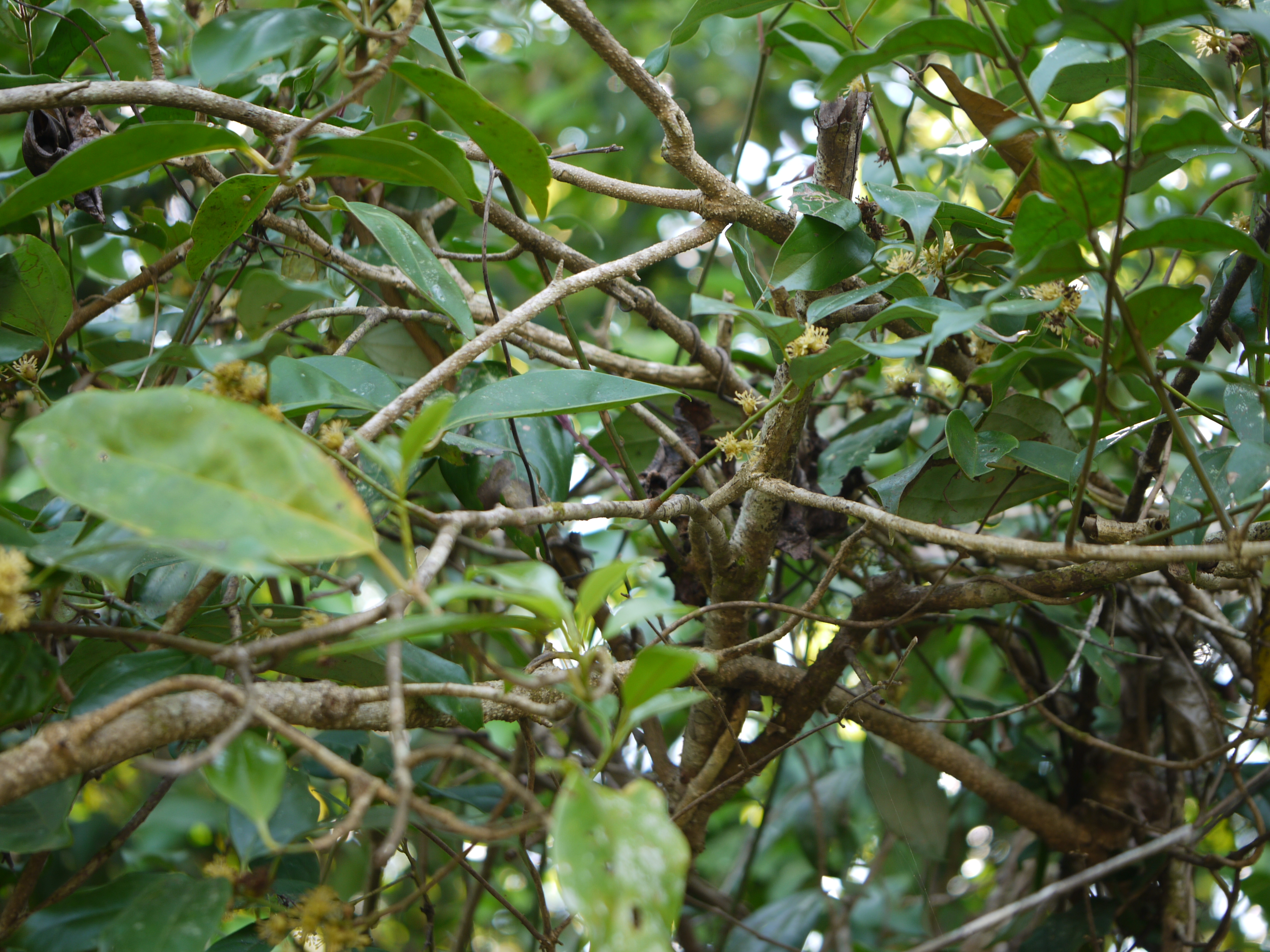

Conservation status
- Least Concern (IUCN 3.1)

Scientific classification
- Kingdom: Plantae
- Clade: Tracheophytes
- Clade: Angiosperms
- Clade: Magnoliids
- Order: Laurales
- Family: Lauraceae
- Genus: Neolitsea
- Species: N. cassia

Binomial name
- Neolitsea cassia (L.), Kosterm.

Synonyms
- Balanopsis cassia (L.) Raf.; Camphorina cassia (L.) Farw.; Cinnamomum cassia (L.) J.Presl; Laurus cassia L. (1753); Neolitsea balakrishnanii Chakrab. & Goel; Persea cassia (L.) Spreng.

= Neolitsea cassia =

Species of tree

Neolitsea cassia is a species of flowering plant in the family Lauraceae. It is known as "dawulu kurundu - දවුල් කුරුදු" or "kudu dawula - කුඩු දවුල" in Sinhala. It is a shrub or tree native to India, Sri Lanka, and the northern Andaman Islands.

== Trunk ==
Bark - thick, smooth, gray; W- light, hard, pale orange.

== Ecology ==
Montane and rain forest understory.

== Uses ==
Wood - panelling; leaves- mucilaginous extract used in preparation of local sweet called aasmi; bark, leaves - medicinal.

== Identification ==
Straight stem with greyish bark and short, slender branches. The leaf flush is smooth, silvery copper, drooping, crowded at the ends of branchlets, and turn bright green when mature. Leaves are lanceolate in shape with a slightly pointed base and a tapering pointed apex, about 6–18 cm long and 1.5–4 cm broad. The three veins beginning from the base are prominent, but the lateral veins are faint on the upper surface. The petiole appears as channeled above. Pale yellow flowers are seen in small clusters borne on short branchlets on the internodes. Male and female flowers are distinguishable. The fruit is dark purple, ovoid in shape, about 1.0 cm in size with a ring-like cap at the base.
