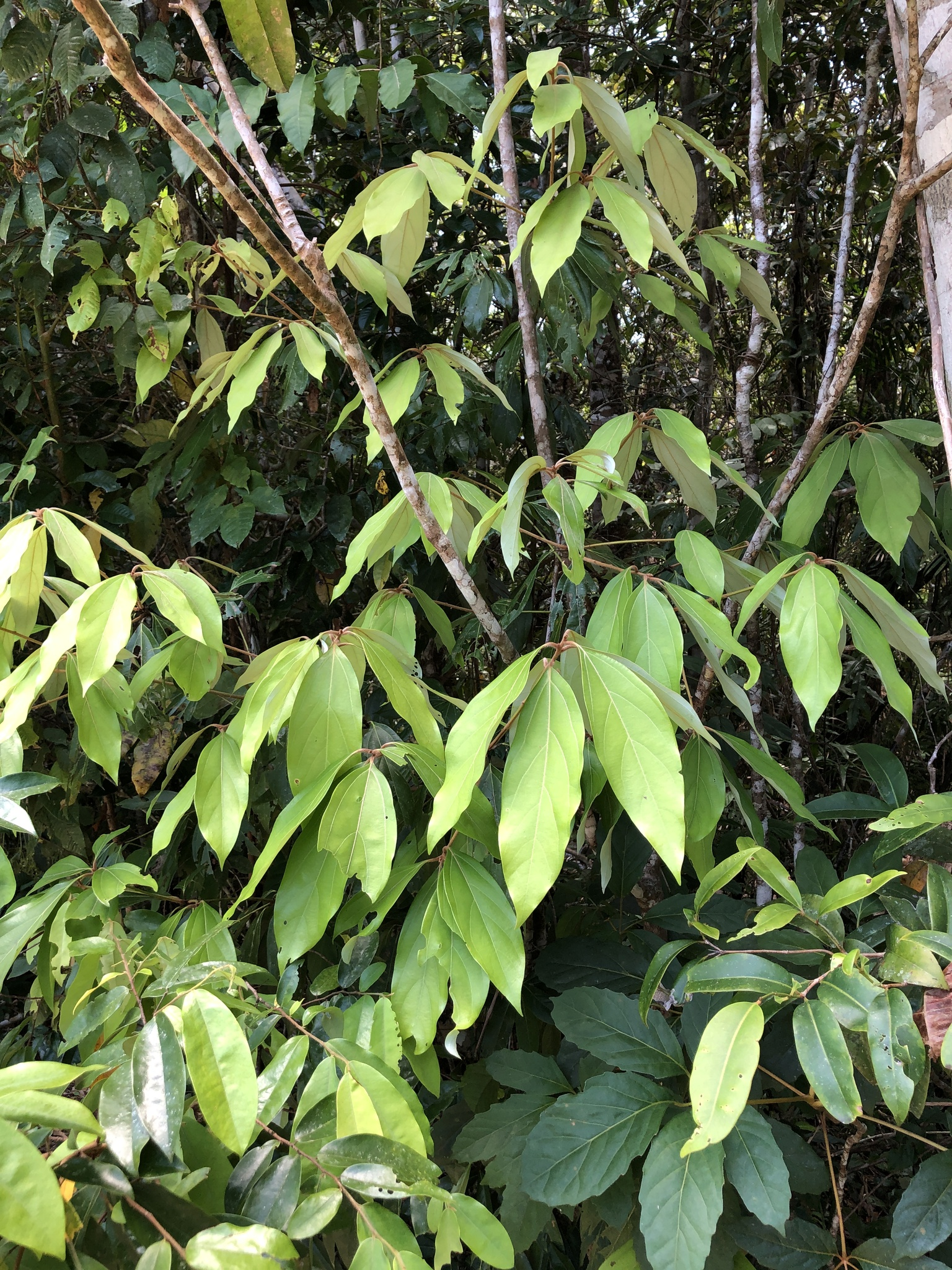

Conservation status
- Least Concern (NCA)
- Least Concern (IUCN 3.1)

Scientific classification
- Kingdom: Plantae
- Clade: Tracheophytes
- Clade: Angiosperms
- Clade: Magnoliids
- Order: Laurales
- Family: Lauraceae
- Genus: Neolitsea
- Species: N. dealbata

Binomial name
- Neolitsea dealbata (R.Br.) Merr.

Synonyms
- Bryantea dealbata (R.Br.) Raf.; Litsea dealbata (R.Br.) Nees; Malapoenna dealbata (R.Br.) Kuntze; Tetranthera dealbata R.Br.; Litsea baueri Endl.; Litsea dealbata var. glabrata Meisn.; Litsea dealbata var. incisa Meisn.; Litsea dealbata var. rufa Benth.; Litsea dealbata var. typica Domin; Litsea rufa Nees; Tetradenia baueri (Endl.) Pax

= Neolitsea dealbata =

Bolly gum

Species of plant in the laurel family

Neolitsea dealbata, also known as white bolly gum, hairy-leaved bolly gum, or simply bolly gum (amongst others) (Note: See Vernacular names section), is a shrub or small tree in the laurel family Lauraceae which is native to New South Wales and Queensland in Australia.

== Description ==
The bolly gum is an evergreen tree growing up to 15 m (49 ft) high, the trunk can reach 30 cm (12 in) diameter and may be buttressed. The twigs are densely covered in fine brown hairs on the younger parts and are terete (circular in cross-section). The leaves are generally elliptic but may be obovate or lanceolate, and new growth is also covered in brown hairs. They measure between 7 and 22 cm (2.8 and 8.7 in) long by 3 and 8 cm (1.2 and 3.1 in) wide. The upper surface is glossy green, the underside is whitish or glaucous.

The inflorescence is an umbel produced in the leaf axils or directly from the twigs. There are up to five flowers per umbel, cream, yellow or pale brown in colour, and measuring from 2 to 8 cm (0.79 to 3.15 in) long. The female flowers are about half as long as male ones. The globose (roughly spherical) fruit is a drupe up to 11 mm (0.43 in) in diameter, green when immature and dark red to black when ripe, and they contain a single seed.

== Taxonomy ==
This species has been given several names since it was first described in 1810 by the Scottish botanist Robert Brown, who originally called it Tetranthera dealbata. Later, the genus Tetranthera was subsumed by Litsea Lam., and the German botanist Nees von Esenbeck published a new name for the species - Litsea dealbata - in 1836. In 1838 Constantine Samuel Rafinesque, a French polymath, again revised T. dealbata in his book Sylva telluriana and gave it the new combination Bryantea dealbata.

Rafinesque's work, despite being a validly published name, was largely ignored by his contemporaries and in 1948 the American botanist Elmer Drew Merrill published a new combination that is still accepted, i.e. Neolitsea dealbata.

=== Etymology ===
The genus name Neolitsea is a combination of the Ancient Greek word néos (meaning "new") and the pre-existing genus name Litsea. The members of Neolitsea were mostly transferred from Litsea. The species epithet dealbata is Latin for "whitewashed", and refers to the white undersides of the leaves.

=== Vernacular names ===
Many common names have been used for this plant, including those in the following list. Other variations exist which are minor differences between, for example, "bollygum" and "bolly gum", etc.

- black ash
- bolly gum
- grey bollywood
- native mulberry
- pigeon-berry tree
- white bollywood
- white bollygum
- velvet-leaf bollywood
- hairy-leaved bollygum

== Distribution and habitat ==
The bolly gum has a wide distribution on the coast and adjacent tablelands of eastern Australia, stretching from islands of the Torres Strait south to the Illawarra region south of Sydney. It is an understory species found in rainforest and wet sclerophyll forest on a variety of soil types, and at altitudes from sea level to 1,150 m (3,770 ft).

== Ecology ==
This plant is a host species for larvae of the moths Acrocercops ordinatella and Gibbovalva quadrifasciata, as well as the blue triangle butterfly (Graphium sarpedon). Cassowaries (Casuarius casuarius) and fruit doves (genus Ptilinopus) are known to eat the fruit of these trees, and it's likely that many other frugivorous birds do so as well. The fungus Phyllachora queenslandica is found on Neolitsea dealbata.

== Gallery ==
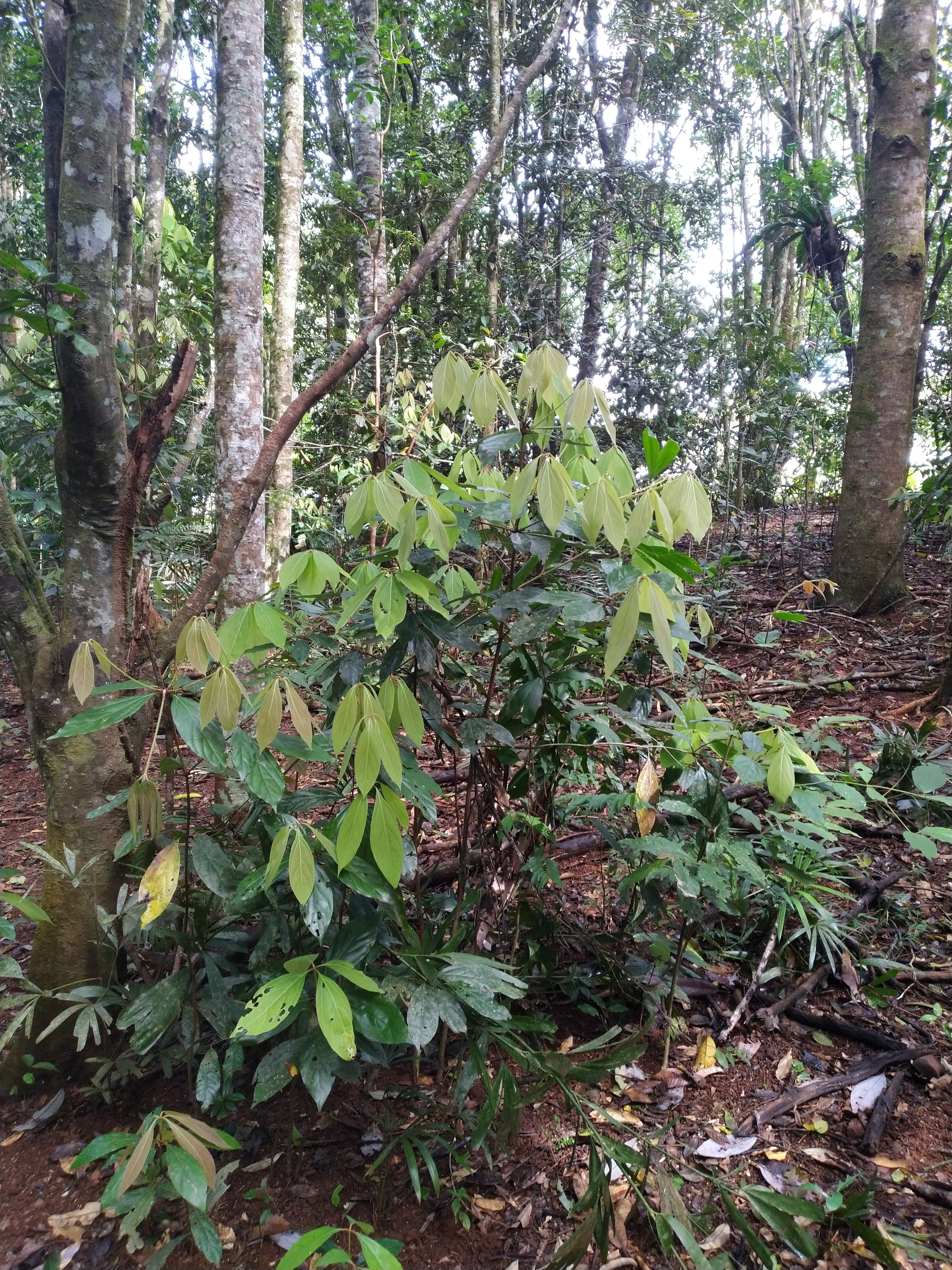
Young plant in rainforest near Malanda, Queensland

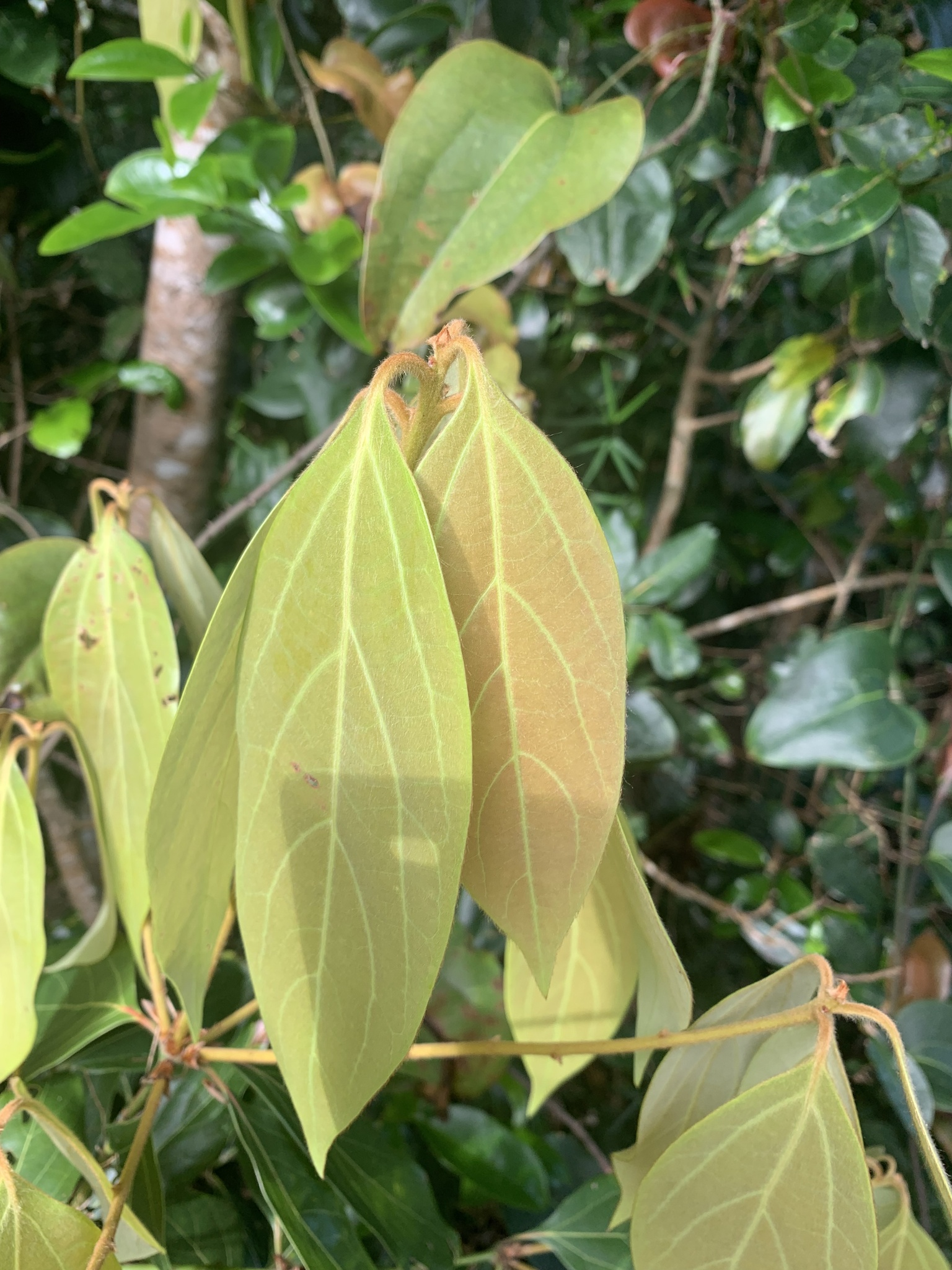
New growth

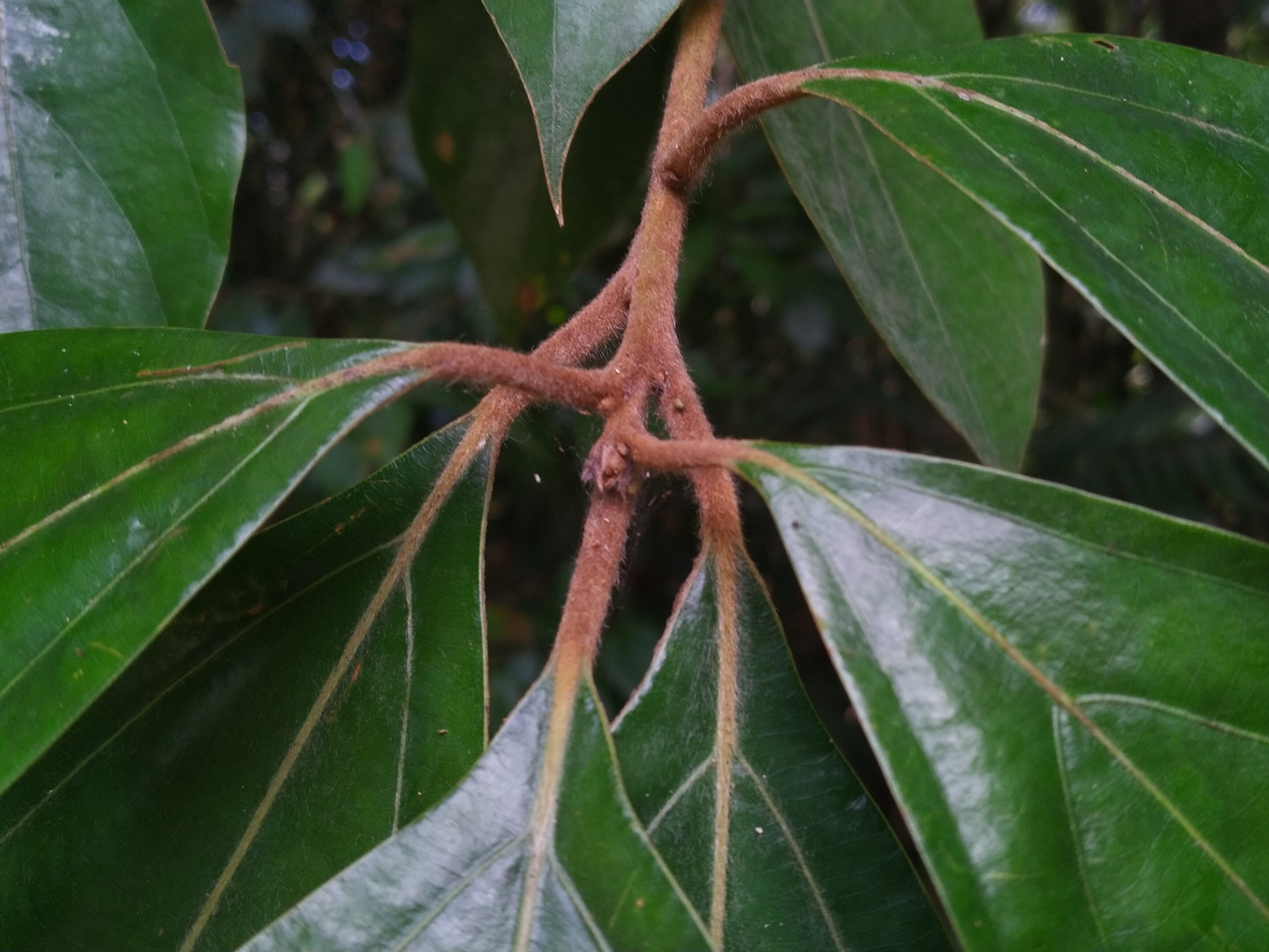
Dense brown hairs on twigs and petioles

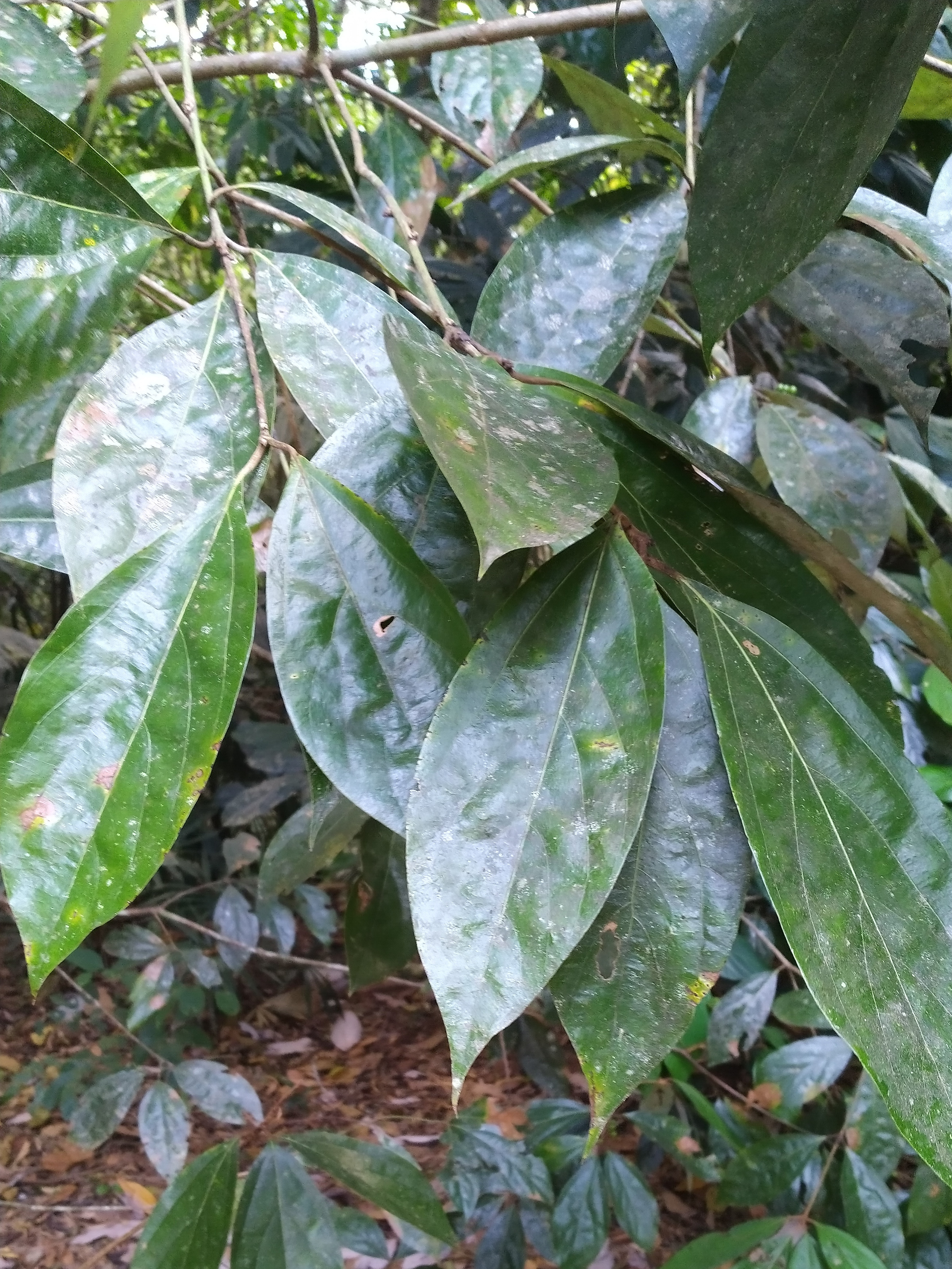
Foliage

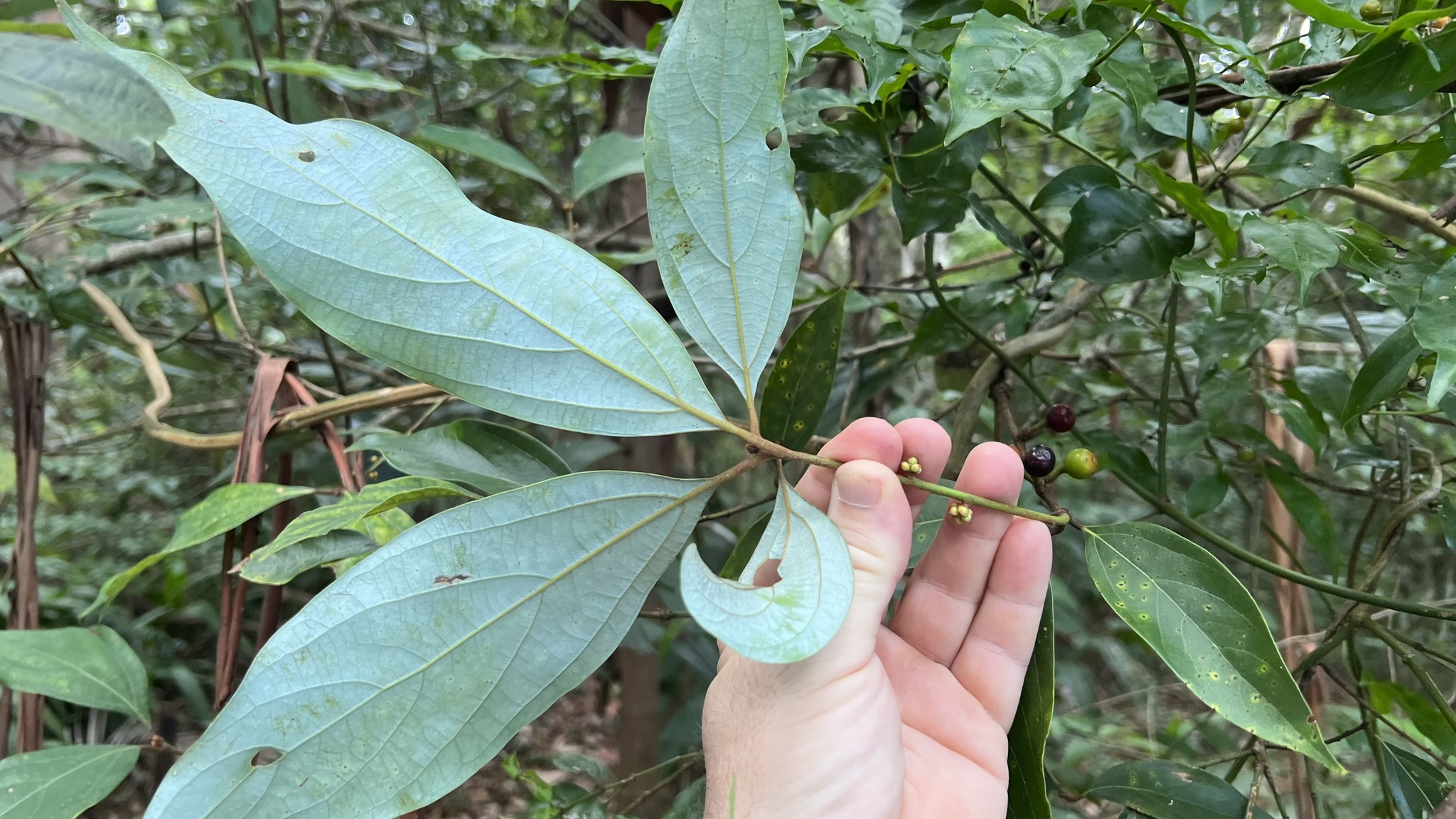
Underside of leaves

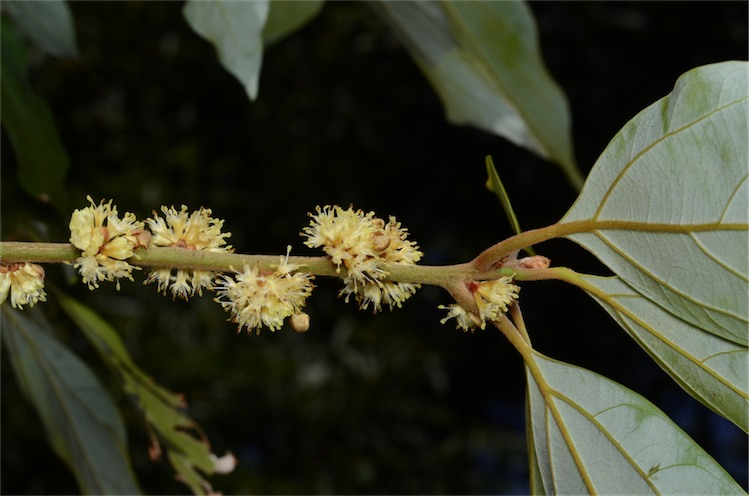
Inflorescences

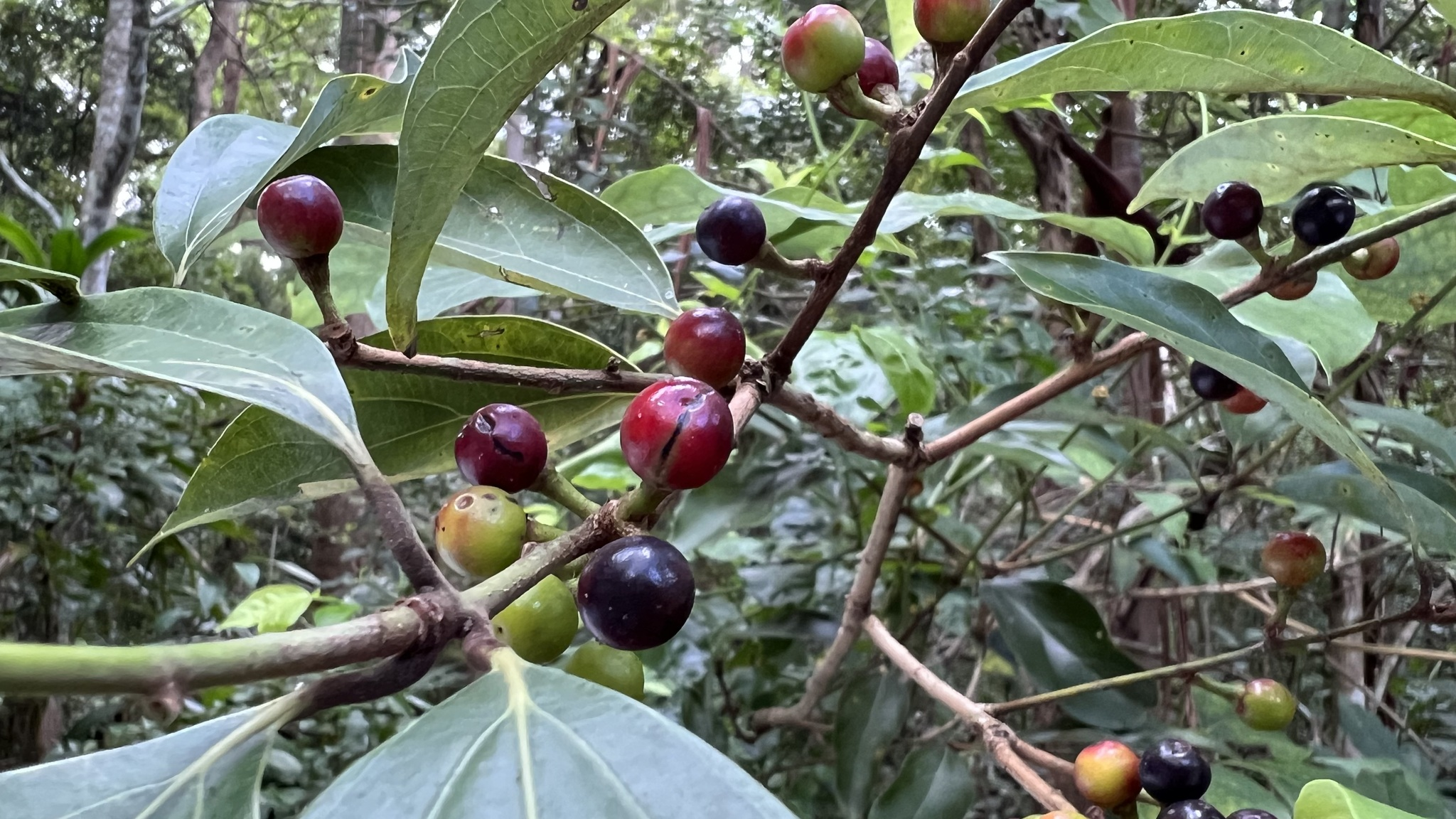
Fruit in various stages of development

== Notes ==
External links

- Data related to Neolitsea dealbata at Wikispecies
- Media related to Neolitsea dealbata at Wikimedia Commons
- View a map of historical sightings of this species at the Australasian Virtual Herbarium
- View observations of this species on iNaturalist
- View images of this species on Flickriver
