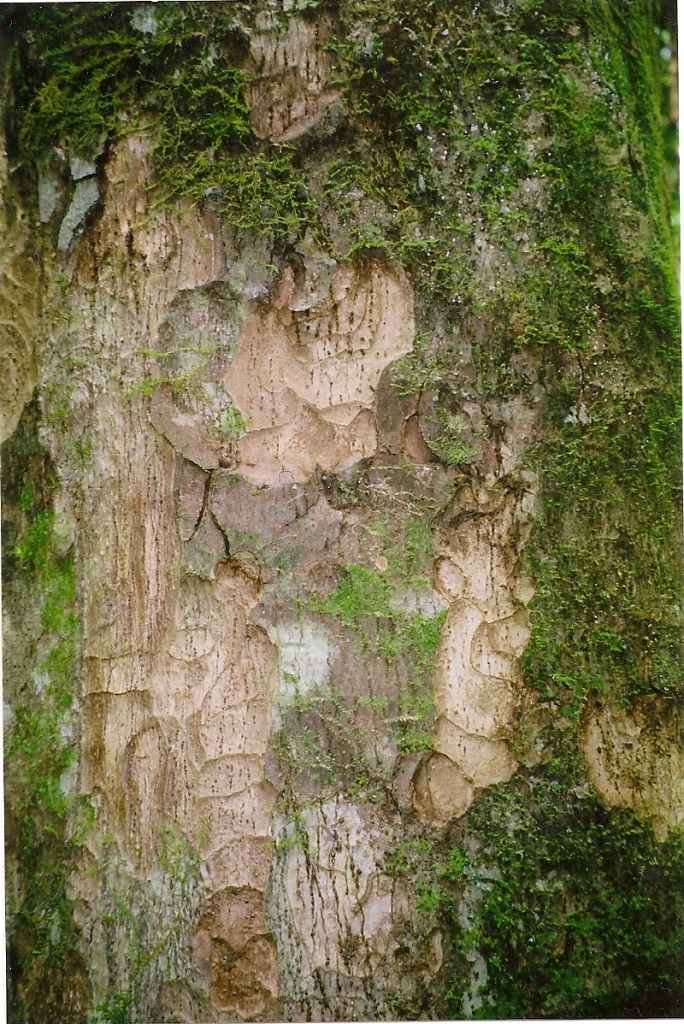
- Litsea reticulata bark at Coorabakh National Park, Australia

Conservation status
- Least Concern (IUCN 3.1)

Scientific classification
- Kingdom: Plantae
- Clade: Embryophytes
- Clade: Tracheophytes
- Clade: Spermatophytes
- Clade: Angiosperms
- Clade: Magnoliids
- Order: Laurales
- Family: Lauraceae
- Genus: Litsea
- Species: L. reticulata

Binomial name
- Litsea reticulata (Meisn.) Benth. & Hook.f. ex F.Muell.

Synonyms
- Malapoenna reticulata Kuntze; Tetranthera reticulata Meisn.; Tetranthera reticulata var. parvifolia Meisn.

= Litsea reticulata =

Species of tree

Litsea reticulata is a common Australian tree, growing from near Milton, New South Wales to the Bunya Mountains, Queensland. Common names include bollygum, bolly wood and brown beech. The habitat of the bollygum is rainforest of most types, except the dryer forms.

== Taxonomy ==
Litsea reticulata was first described by Meisner in 1864 as Tetranthera reticulata, before being given its current name by von Mueller in 1882. Common names include bolly gum, bolly beech, brown beech, brown bolly beech, sycamore, brown Bollywood, soft bollygum, and brown bollygum.

== Description ==
Litsea reticulata is a medium to large size tree, occasionally reaching 40 metres in height and a 150 cm in trunk diameter.

The bark is a grey, brown and scaly, with numerous depressions caused by the shedding of round scales of bark, colloquially known as "bollies". Exposed bark is a paler colour, giving the trunk a patchy appearance. Litsea reticulata are slightly buttressed or flanged at the base.

=== Leaves, flowers and fruit ===
The leaves are alternate, not toothed. 5 to 10 cm long, blunt or slightly pointed, the leaves are veiny underneath. Leaf stalks are 5 to 12 mm long.

Litsea reticulata is dioecious (male and female flowers are on separate trees). Flowers cream or green with pink. Flowering period is May to July.

The fruit matures from November to April, being a purple/black 14 mm long drupe, in a green cup shaped receptacle, with a single seed, 11 mm long.

Seed germination can be slow. However, at other times, 60% germination result can be achieved within a month of sowing. The flesh should be removed from the fruit before sowing the seeds.

Fruit are eaten by many rainforest birds, including the wompoo fruit dove, catbird, topknot pigeon and white-headed pigeon.

== Gallery ==
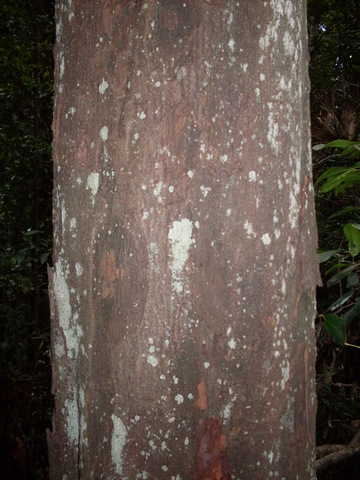
Litsea reticulata growing near the Hacking River, Australia

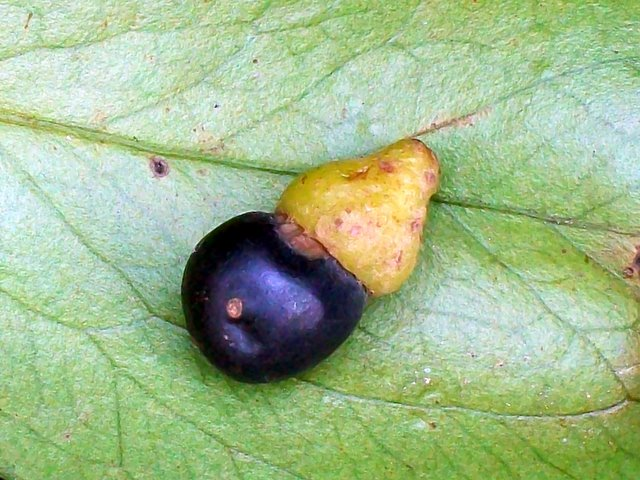
Litsea reticulata fruit Foxground, Australia

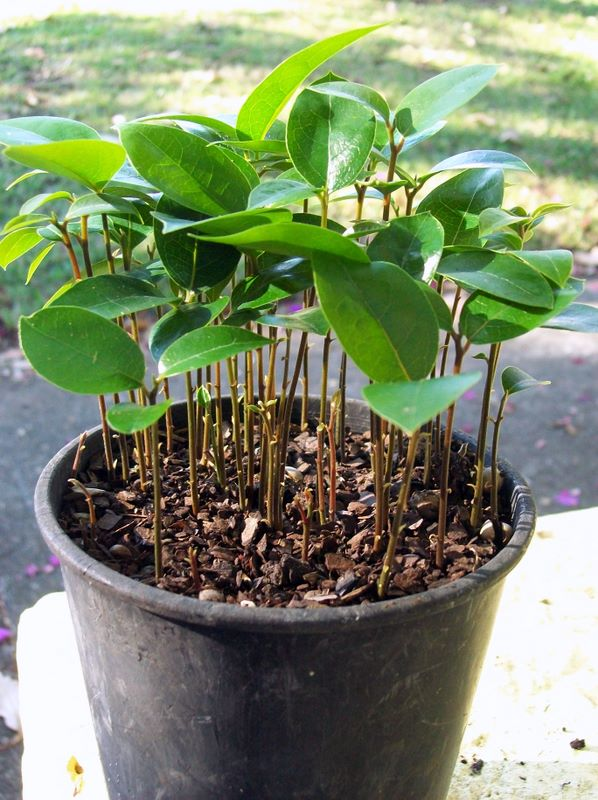
Litsea reticulata seedlings
