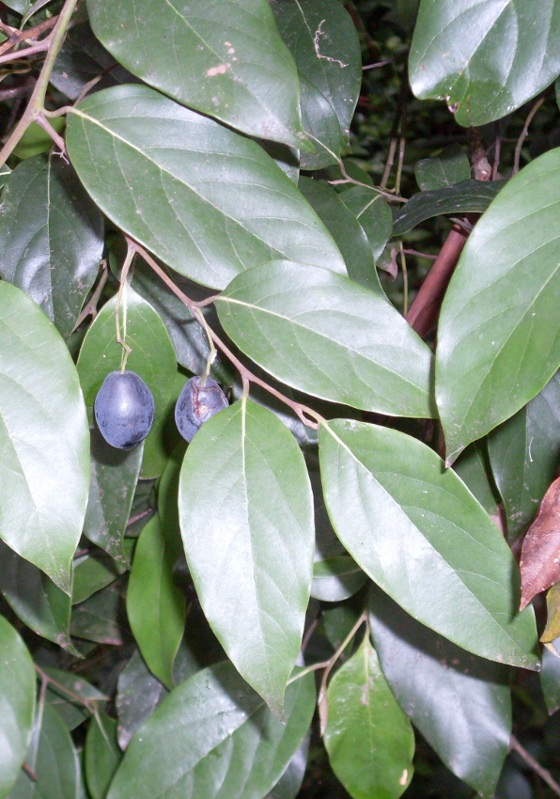
- Leaves and fruit

Conservation status
- Least Concern (IUCN 3.1)

Scientific classification
- Kingdom: Plantae
- Clade: Tracheophytes
- Clade: Angiosperms
- Clade: Magnoliids
- Order: Laurales
- Family: Lauraceae
- Genus: Cryptocarya
- Species: C. rigida

Binomial name
- Cryptocarya rigida Meisn.

Synonyms
- Cryptocarya patentinervis F.Muell. ex Meisn. nom. inval., pro syn.; Cryptocarya patentinervis F.Muell. nom. inval., nom. nud.; Cryptocarya patentinervis F.Muell. ex Benth. nom. illeg.

= Cryptocarya rigida =

Species of tree

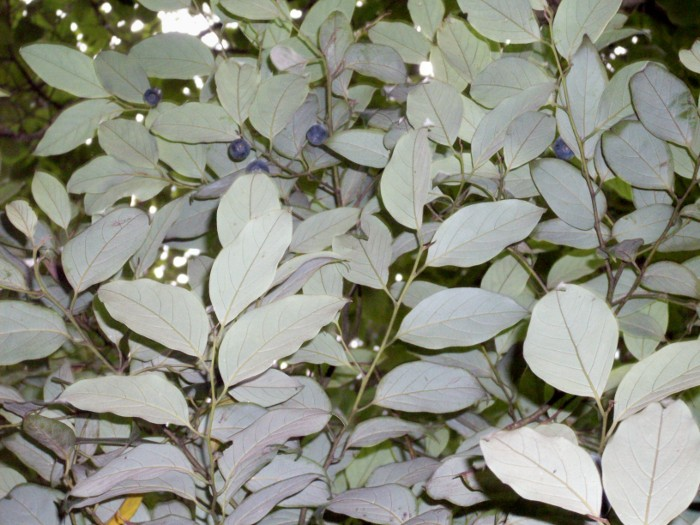
Cryptocarya rigida − underside of leaves

Cryptocarya rigida, commonly known as rose maple, southern maple, rose walnut, pigeonberry ash, forest maple or brown beech, is a species of flowering plant in the family Lauraceae and is endemic to eastern Australia. It is a shrub or small tree with lance-shaped to egg-shaped leaves, creamy green flowers, and elliptic black drupes.

== Description ==
Cryptocarya rigida is a shrub or small tree that typically grows to a height of 10 m (33 ft) with a dbh of about 20 cm (7.9 in) and has grey, thin corky bark, it stems not buttressed. Its leaves are lance-shaped to elliptic, 60–135 mm (2.4–5.3 in) long and 12–50 mm (0.47–1.97 in) wide, covered with soft hairs, and glaucous on the lower surface. The flowers are usually arranged in panicles in leaf axils and shorter than the leaves. They are creamy-green, not perfumed, the perianth tube 1.4–1.6 mm (0.06–0.06 in) long and 1.7–1.8 mm (0.07–0.07 in) wide. The tepals are 1.5–2.0 mm (0.059–0.079 in) long and 0.9–1.5 mm (0.035–0.059 in) wide, the outer anthers about 0.8 mm (0.03 in) long and 0.6–0.7 mm (0.02–0.03 in) wide, the inner anthers 0.8–0.9 mm (0.03–0.04 in) long and 0.5–0.6 mm (0.02–0.02 in) wide. Flowering occurs from October to March, and the fruit is an elliptic black drupe, 17–25 mm (0.7–1.0 in) long and 11–17.5 mm (0.43–0.69 in) wide with creamy cotyledons.

== Taxonomy ==
Cryptocarya rigida was first formally described in 1864 by Carl Meissner in de Candolle's Prodromus Systematis Naturalis Regni Vegetabilis from specimens collected near the Clarence River by Ferdinand von Mueller. The specific epithet (rigida) means 'rigid'.

== Distribution and habitat ==
This species of Cryptocarya grows in rainforest, especially near the edges of rainforest, from 150–900 m (490–2,950 ft) elevation, from near Springbrook in southern Queensland to Dungog and Ourimbah in New South Wales.

The species is extinct in the Illawarra region (34° S), allegedly seen there in 1818 by Allan Cunningham.

== Use in horticulture ==
Like most Australian species of Cryptocarya, removal of the fleshy aril is advised to assist seed germination, which is slow but reliable with C. rigida.
