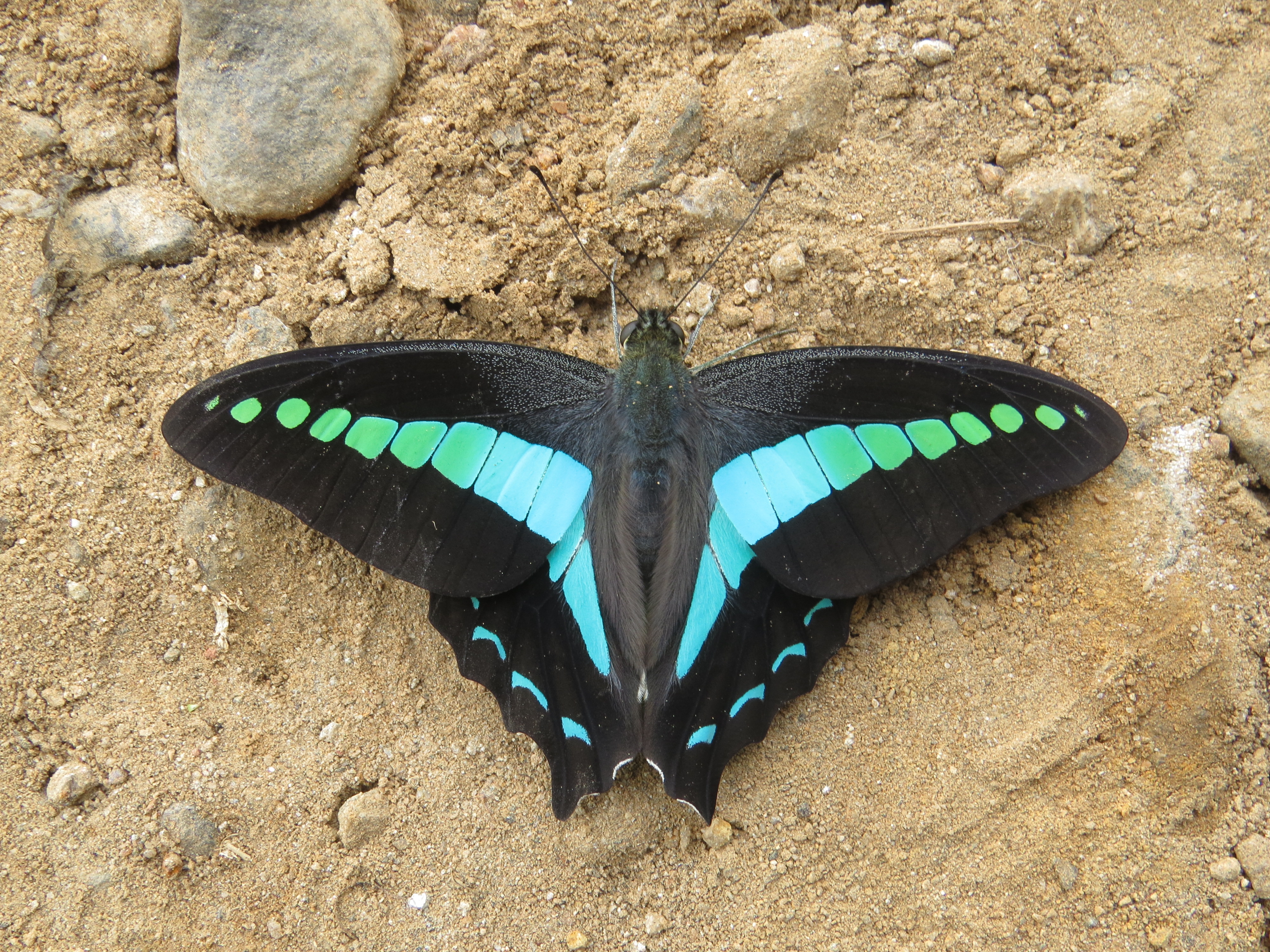
- Mud-puddling, Virajpet, Karnataka, India

Scientific classification
- Kingdom: Animalia
- Phylum: Arthropoda
- Clade: Pancrustacea
- Class: Insecta
- Order: Lepidoptera
- Family: Papilionidae
- Genus: Graphium
- Species: G. teredon

Binomial name
- Graphium teredon C. Felder & R. Felder, 1865

= Graphium teredon =

Species of butterfly

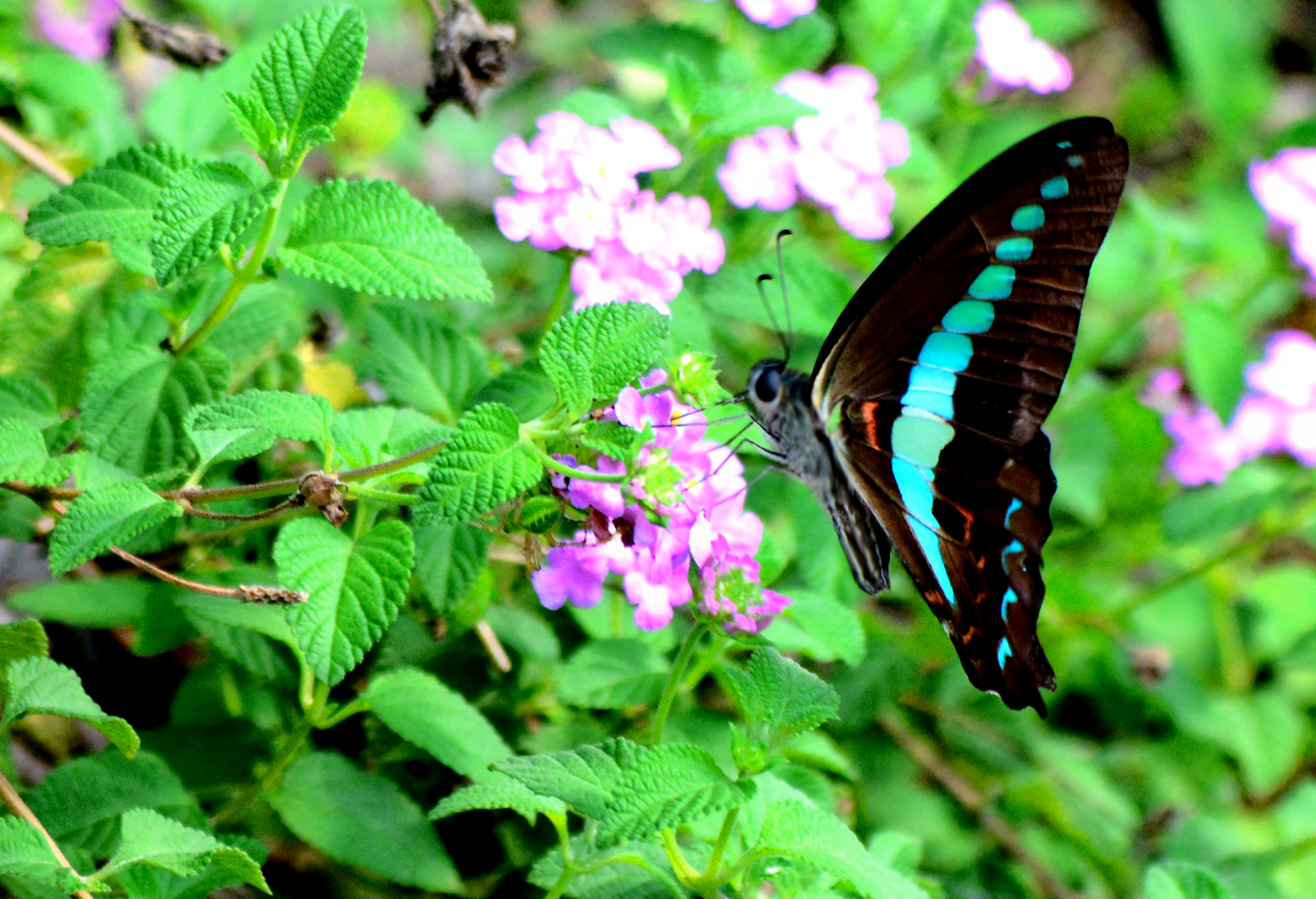
southern bluebottle at Thiruvananthapuram, Kerala, India

Graphium teredon, the southern bluebottle or narrow banded bluebottle, is a species of swallowtail butterfly. It is found in southern India and Sri Lanka.

== Description ==
Male and female. Upperside black, with similar markings to those in Graphium sarpedon. Forewing with the transverse macular band generally much narrower, the upper spots being smaller and wider separated, and the lower portions mostly divided by black veins; the band is composed of either eight or nine portions, the upper spot being sometimes absent, in both sexes from Sri Lanka and south India, the band being either at its narrowest or widest width, this spot—when present—is very small. Hindwing produced into a rather prominent tooth at end of upper median veinlet; the medial band mostly narrower than in G. sarpedon.

Underside with the transverse bands as above. Hindwing with the subbasal crimson bar not inwardly bordered with black; other markings similar to G. sarpedon.

== Habitat ==
Graphium teredon is primarily an inhabitant of moist, low-level rain forests (below 1600 m (5000 ft)). In these elevations it is usually seen flying just above the tree canopy.

== Behaviour ==
The males are known for their habit of feeding by the edges of puddles, often at the roadside. Occasionally, as many as eight will be seen at the same puddle. They have also been known to be attracted to animal droppings, carcasses and rotting insects.

It has been recorded as a migrant in South India and is known to mud-puddle during migration. The butterfly has been seen as comprising as much as 5% of the population of migrating butterflies during a 72-hour period in the Nilgiri hills.

The southern bluebottle is known for quick flight and rapid reactions. Consequently, it is difficult to catch.

=== Diet ===
The adult common bluebottle feeds on nectar from a variety of flowering herbs. The larvae feed primarily on the leaves of trees in the families Lauraceae, Myrtaceae, Sapotaceae, and Rutaceae. In particular, G. teredon often feed on leaves of the cinnamon bark tree (Cinnamomum zeylanicum) or of the Indian laurel (Litsea sebifera).

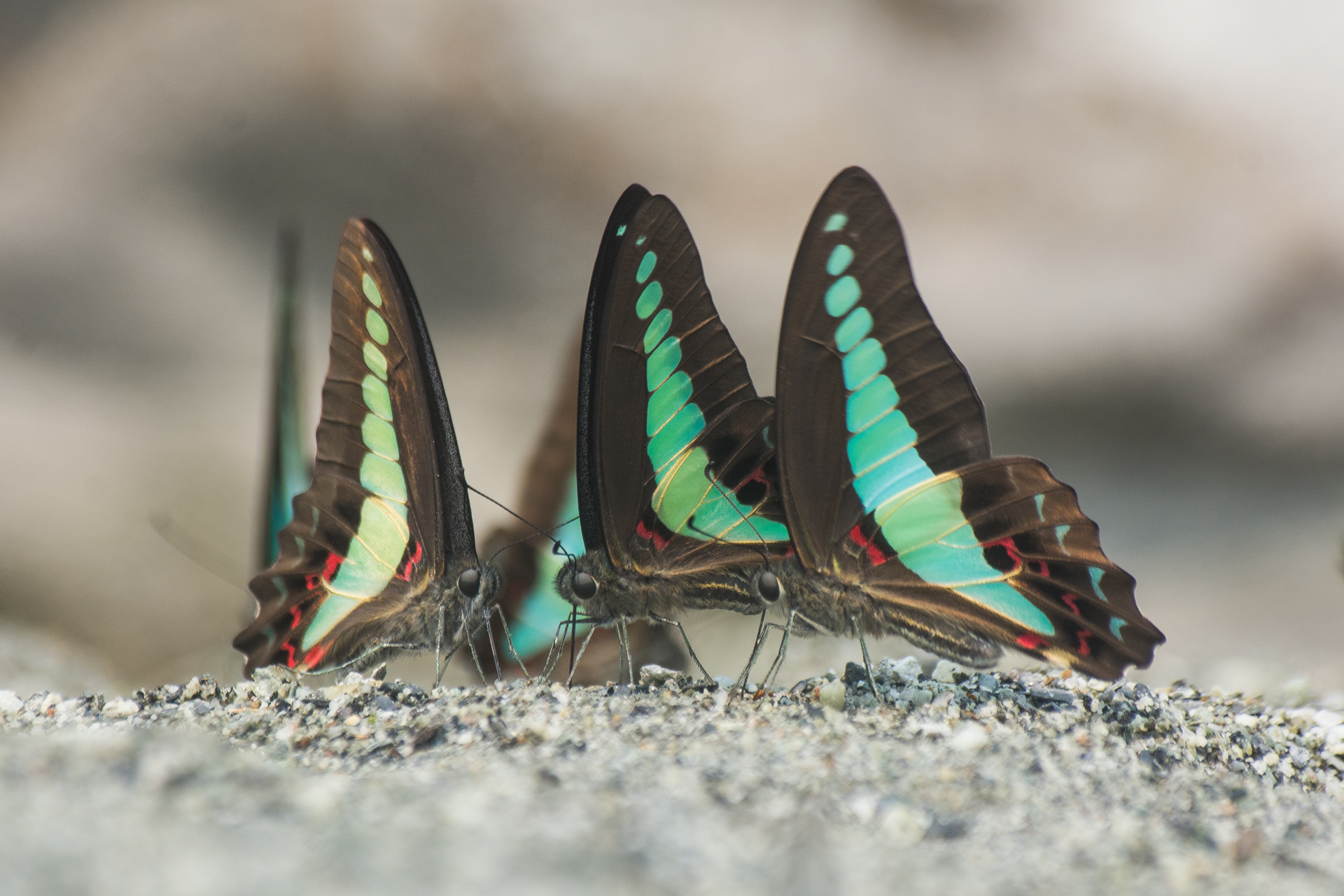
Graphium Teredon in Puddling in Buxa Tiger reserve

The list of larval food plants also include Alseodaphne semecarpifolia, Cinnamomum camphora, Cinnamomum macrocarpum, Cinnamomum malabathrum, Litsea chinensis, Polyalthia longifolia, Miliusa tomentosa, Persea macrantha and Michelia doltospa.

== Life cycle ==
=== Egg ===
The egg is yellowish, laid singly on the leaves of a host plant.

=== Larva ===
When young, is black or dark green, with numerous spines; when full grown, it is green with a short spines on each thoracic segment and anal segment. There is a transverse yellow band on the 4th segment and a lateral band on the body. The caterpillar usually lies on the centre of a leaf on an upper surface. It is very sluggish and pupates near its feeding spot.

Frederic Moore quoted in Bingham, 1907, described it as: "Smooth, thickened from the second to the 5th segment and thence decreasing to the end; with two short subdorsal fleshy spines on the 4th segment, between which is a transverse pale yellow line, two shorter spines also on the 2nd and 3rd and two on the anal segment; colour green, with a longitudinal posterior lateral and lower pale yellowish line."

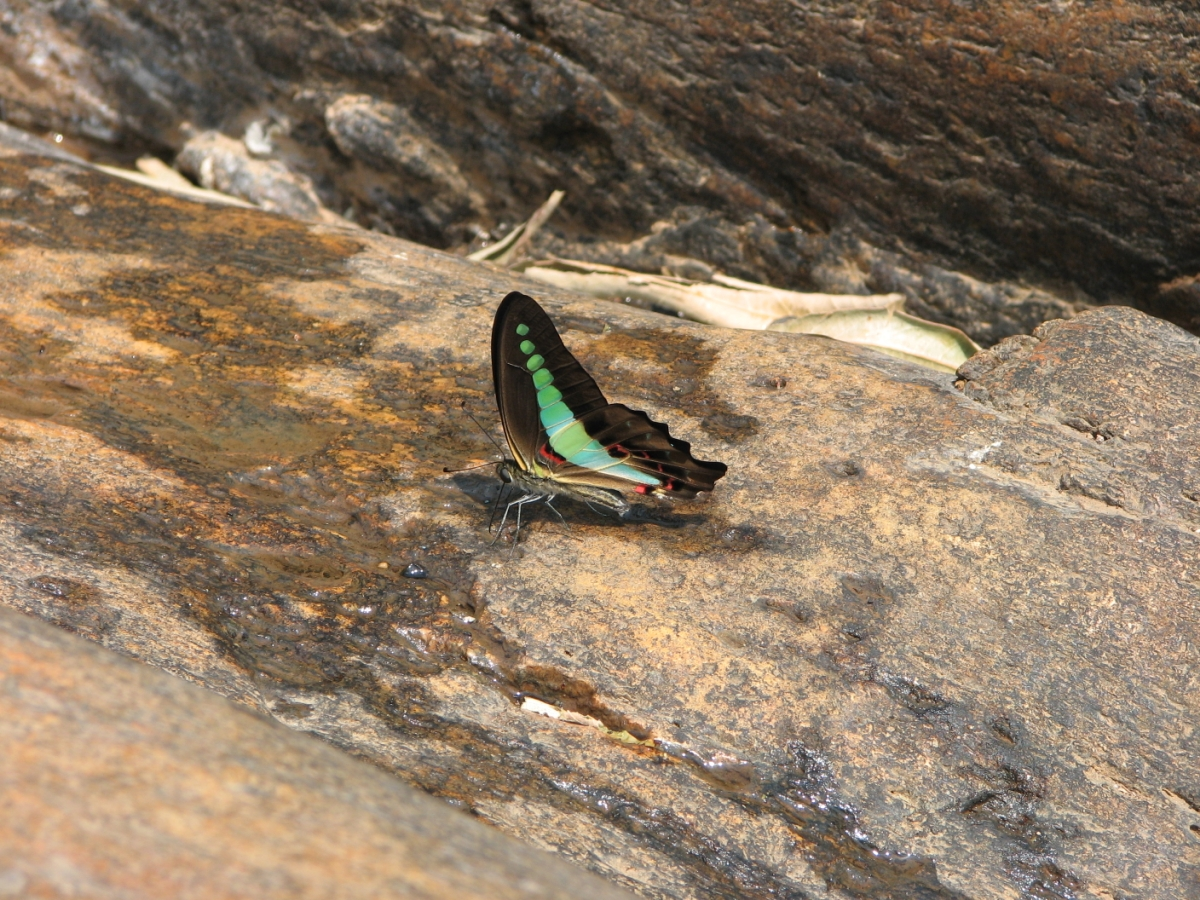
Butterfly blue bottle aralam wls

=== Pupa ===
The pupa is green with a slender and pointed thoracic projection, yellowish wing cases and lateral bands. "Conical, truncated in front; thorax produced into a lengthened obtusely-pointed frontal process." (Frederic Moore quoted in Bingham, 1907)

== General reading ==
- Kunte, Krushnamegh (2000). Butterflies of Peninsular India. India, A Lifescape. Hyderabad, India: Universities Press. ISBN 978-8173713545.
- Evans, W.H. (1932). The Identification of Indian Butterflies (2nd ed.). Mumbai, India: Bombay Natural History Society.s
