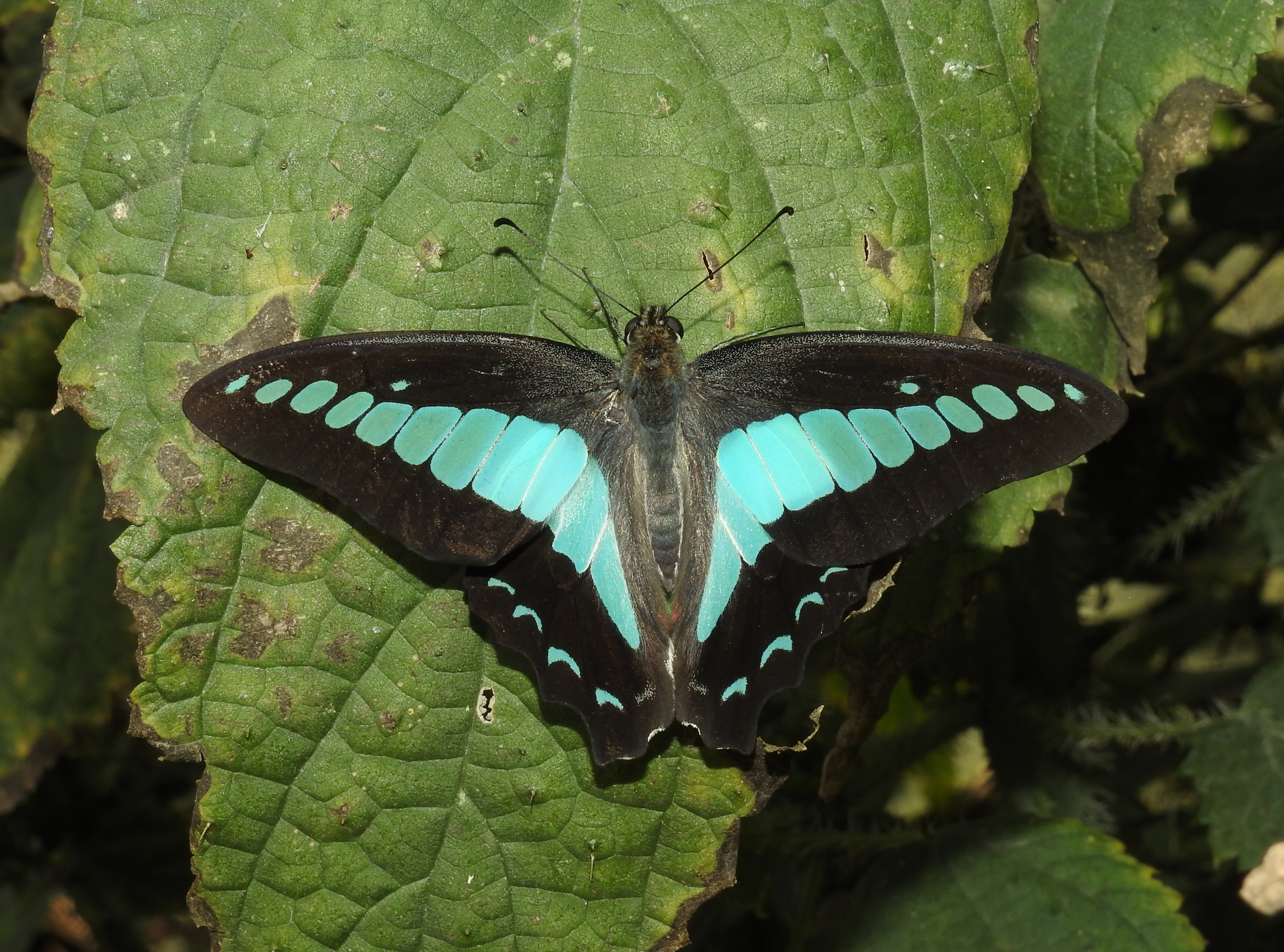
- Resting on a leaf in Uttarakhand, India

Conservation status
- Least Concern (IUCN 3.1)

Scientific classification
- Kingdom: Animalia
- Phylum: Arthropoda
- Clade: Pancrustacea
- Class: Insecta
- Order: Lepidoptera
- Family: Papilionidae
- Genus: Graphium
- Species: G. sarpedon

Binomial name
- Graphium sarpedon (Linnaeus, 1758)

= Graphium sarpedon =

Common bluebottle

Species of butterfly

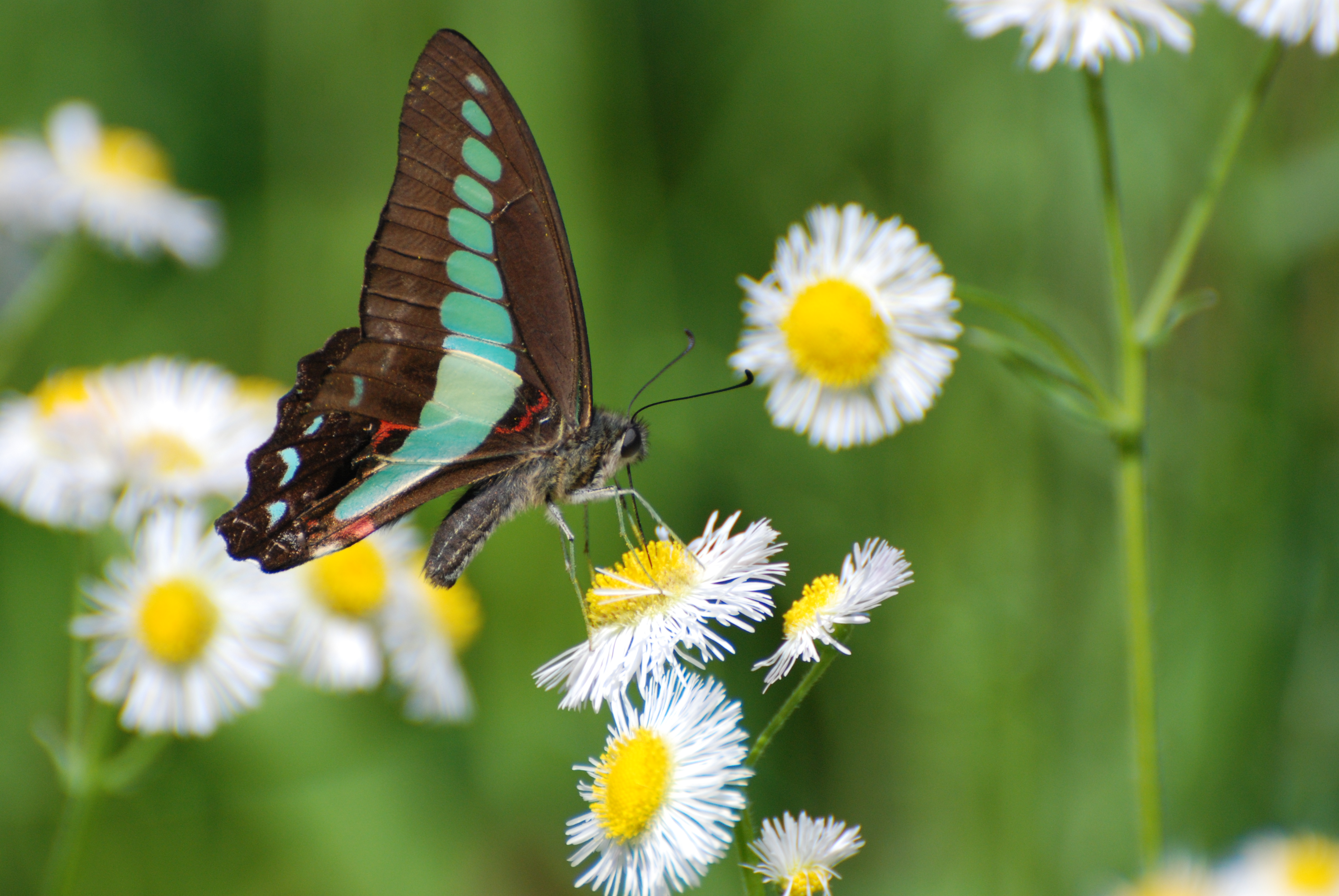
Common blue bottle at Osaka, Japan

Graphium sarpedon, the common bluebottle is a species of swallowtail butterfly that is found in East, South and Southeast Asia. There are approximately sixteen subspecies with differing geographical distributions.

== Description ==
Slow motion video of a common bluebottle in Kanagawa, Japan

Upperside opaque black. Forewings and hindwings crossed from above the tornal area on the hindwing to near the apex of the forewing by a semi-hyaline broad pale blue medial band which is broadest in the middle, more or less greenish and macular anteriorly; the portion of the band that crosses interspaces 6, 7 and 8 on the hindwing white; beyond the band on the hindwing there is a sub-terminal line of blue slender lunules. Underside similar, ground colour dark brown. Hindwing: a short comparatively broad sub-basal band from costa to sub-costal vein, and the postdiscal area between the medial blue band and the sub-terminal lunules velvety black traversed by the pale veins and transversely, except in interspaces 6 and 7, by narrow crimson lines; lastly, a crimson spot near the tornal angle with an admarginal yellowish-white spot below it. Antenna, head, thorax and abdomen brown, the head and thorax suffused with greenish grey; beneath: the palpi, thorax and abdomen touched with dingy white, the abdomen with two whitish lateral lines.

Male has abdominal fold within grey, furnished with a tuft of long, somewhat stiff white hairs.

Race teredon, Felder. (South India and Sri Lanka) is distinguishable in both sexes by the narrower medial band that crosses both forewing and hindwing. Colour brighter, the contrast between the green of the upper and the blue of the lower portion of the medial band more vivid. Hindwing more produced posteriorly at apex of vein 3, where it forms an elongate tooth or short tail.

Variously reported with wingspans between 55 and 75 mm, the common bluebottle has black upper wings and brown lower wings. Both forewings and hindwings are marked by a central spot in the form of a blue or blue-green triangle, with apex pointing toward the body.

The retinas of the butterfly have 15 types of colour-detecting opsins.

== Habitat ==
Graphium sarpedon is primarily an inhabitant of moist, low-level rain forests (below 1600 m (5000 ft)). In these elevations it is usually seen flying just above the tree canopy. The larvae of the common bluebottle feed on trees of the laurel family, which includes the cinnamon tree, and have expanded their range to include cinnamon tree plantations.

== Subspecies ==
Some of the recognized subspecies are:

- G. s. adonarensis (Rothschild, 1896) - Sumbawa, Flores, Adonara. [Note*]
- G. s. agusyantoei Page & Treadaway, 2013 - Indonesia (Sumatra)
- G. s. colus (Fruhstorfer, 1907) - Philippines (synonym?)
- G. s. connectens (Fruhstorfer, 1906) - Taiwan, China (?)
- G. s. islander Monastyrskii, 2012 - Vietnam
- G. s. messogis - Indonesia, Solomon Islands, New Guinea
- G. s. luctatius (Fruhstorfer, 1907) - Malaysia
- G. s. lycianus -
- G. s. nipponus (Fruhstorfer, 1903) - Japan
- G. s. pagus (Fruhstorfer, 1907) - Philippines (synonym?)
- G. s. sarpedon (Linnaeus, 1758) - India, Sri Lanka
- G. s. semifasciatus - China
- G. s. sirkari -
- G. s. teredon (C. & R. Felder, 1865)) - India, Sri Lanka
- G. s. toxopei -
- G. s. wetterensis Okano, 1993 - Indonesia, Lesser Sunda Islands, Wetter Island
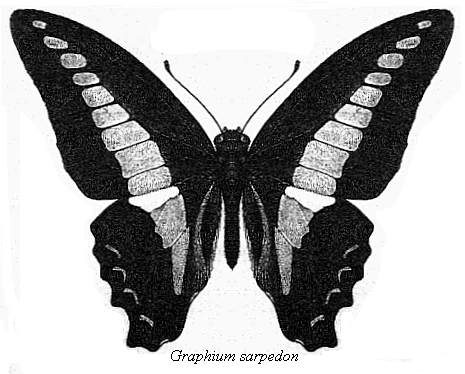
G. s. bingham

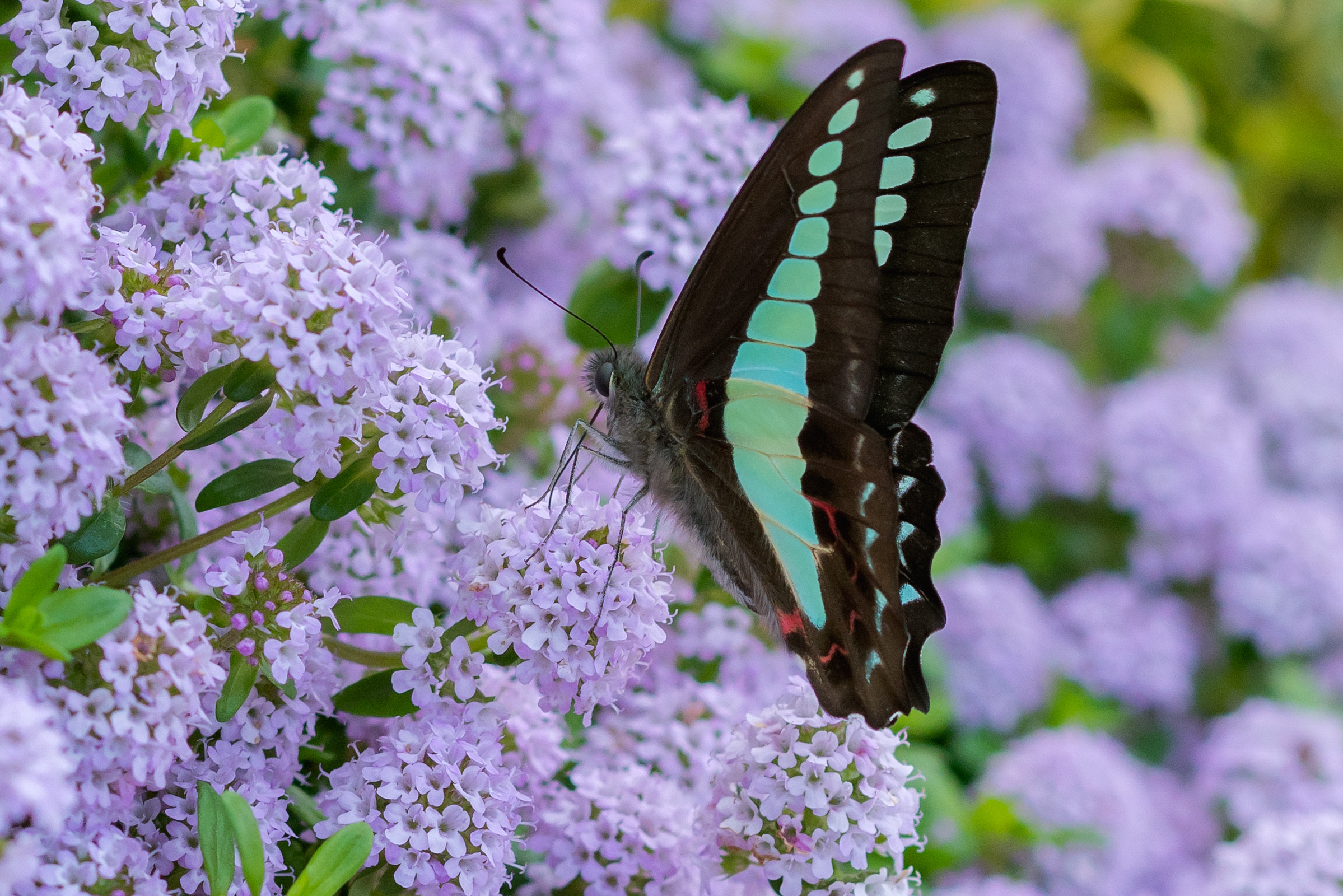
G. s. nipponus, Tokyo

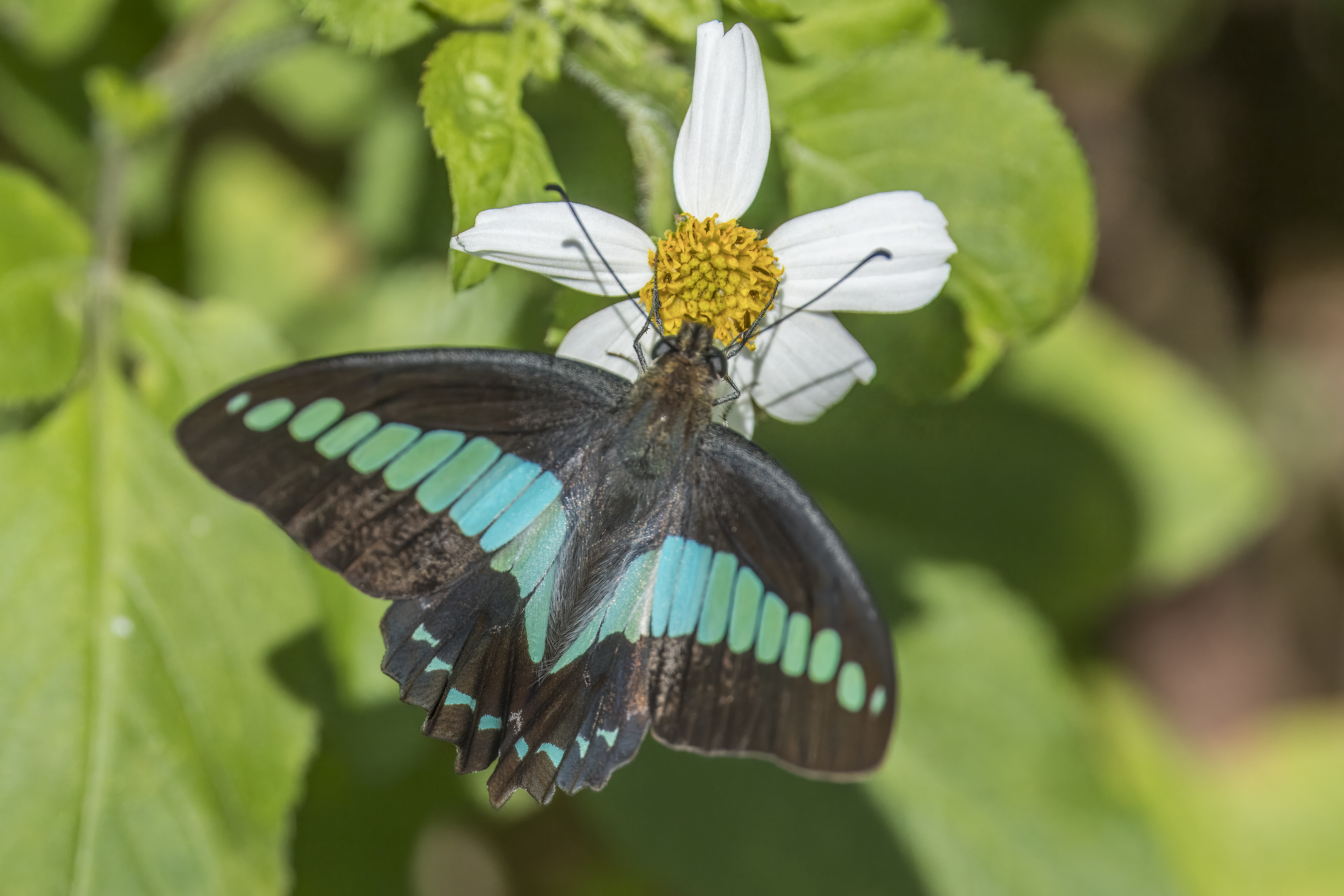
G. s. connectens, Taiwan

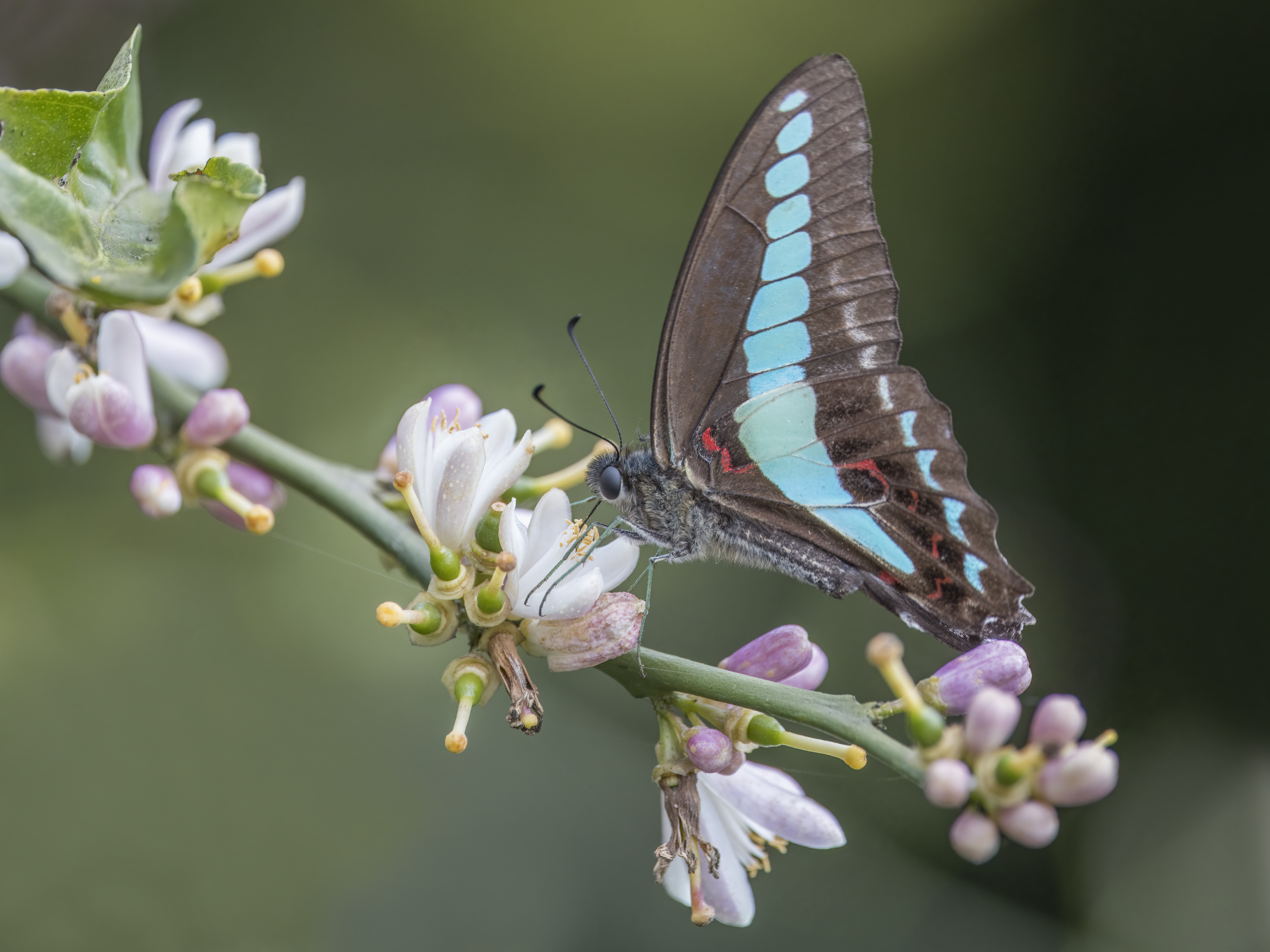
G. s. connectens, Taiwan

G. s. connectens, Taiwan

Others later as species:

- Graphium choredon (Felder & Felder, 1864) - Australia (eastern), in some schemes as G. s. choredon (Felder & Felder, 1864).
- Graphium isander (Godman & Salvin, 1888) - Bougainville Island, Shortland Islands, Santa Isabel Island, Guadalcanal, Florida Islands, Choiseul Island, in some schemes as G. s. isander (Felder & Felder, 1864).
- Graphium jugans (Rothschild, 1896) - Indonesia (Sumba, Timor, Wetar).

Note: Status revised to full species by Page and Treadaway (2013)

Subspecies found in India occur in southern India in the Western Ghats and in the Himalayas from Kashmir in the west to Myanmar.

G. s. milon and G. s. monticolum, however, are not listed here as they are regarded as separate species in a number of works.

== Behaviour ==
The males are known for their habit of feeding by the edges of puddles, often at the roadside. Occasionally, as many as eight will be seen at the same puddle. They have also been known to be attracted to animal droppings, carcasses and rotting insects.

It has been recorded as a migrant in South India and is known to mud-puddle during migration. The butterfly has been seen as comprising as much as 5% of the population of migrating butterflies during a 72-hour period in the Nilgiri hills.

The common bluebottle is known for quick flight and rapid reactions. Consequently, it is difficult to catch.

=== Diet ===
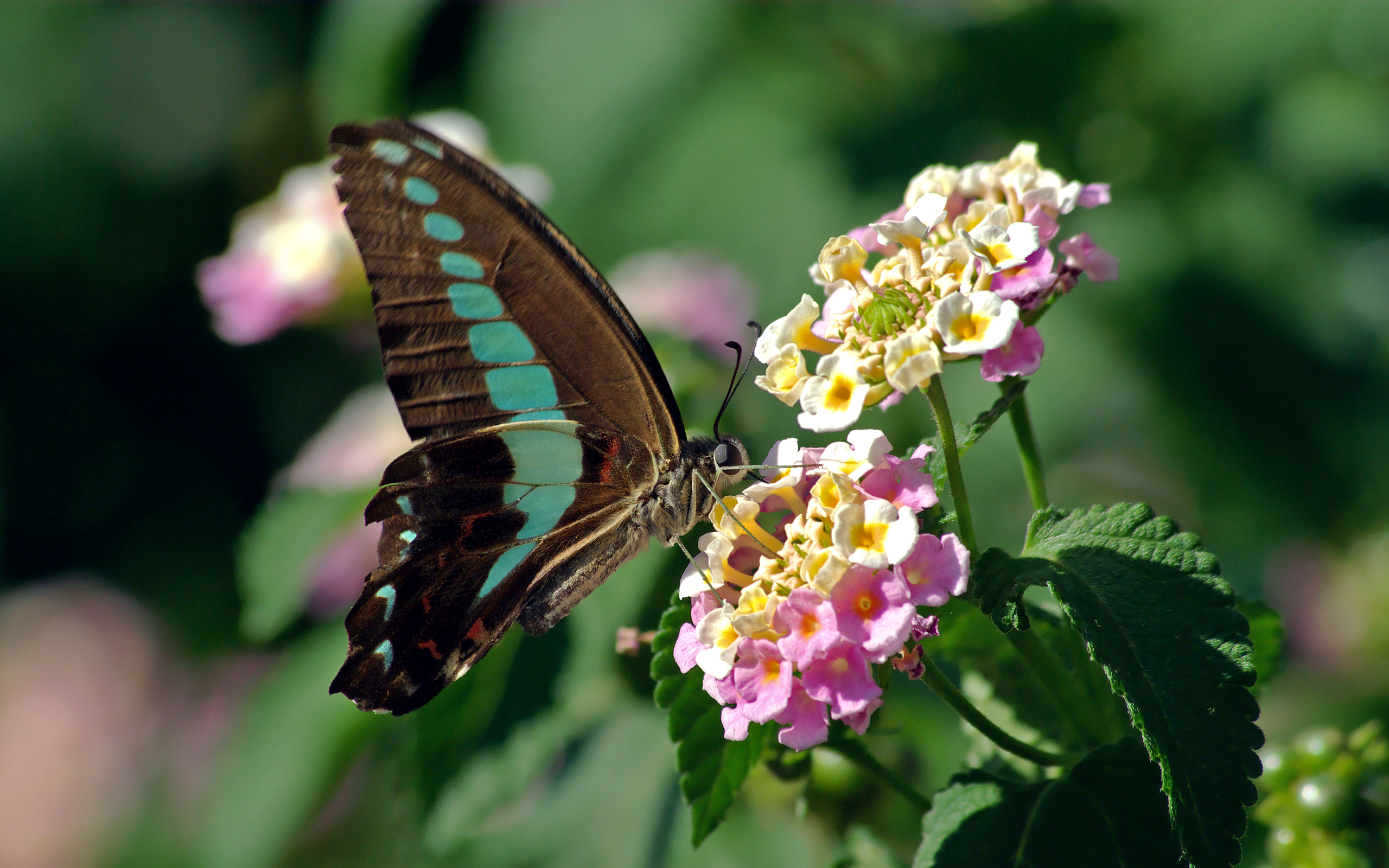
Feeding on Lantana camara. The ventral surface of the wings are visible.

The adult common bluebottle feeds on nectar from a variety of flowering herbs. The larvae feed primarily on the leaves of trees in the families Lauraceae, Myrtaceae, Sapotaceae, and Rutaceae. In particular, G.s. sarpedon and G.s. teredon often feed on leaves of the cinnamon bark tree (Cinnamomum zeylanicum) or of the Indian laurel (Litsea sebifera).

The list of larval food plants also include Alseodaphne semecarpifolia, Cinnamomum camphora, Cinnamomum macrocarpum, Cinnamomum malabathrum, Litsea chinensis, Polyalthia longifolia, Miliusa tomentosa, Persea macrantha and Michelia doltospa.

The larvae of G. s. choredon, native to Australia, feed on many native Australian species of genera Cryptocarya and Litsea; and virtually all subspecies feed on leaves of the camphor tree, Cinnamomum camphora, which is native to China but has been naturalized throughout south-east Asia.

== Life cycle ==
=== Egg ===
The egg is yellowish, laid singly on the leaves of a host plant.

=== Larva ===
When young, is black or dark green, with numerous spines; when full grown, it is green with a short spines on each thoracic segment and anal segment. There is a transverse yellow band on the 4th segment and a lateral band on the body. The caterpillar usually lies on the centre of a leaf on an upper surface. It is very sluggish and pupates near its feeding spot.

Frederic Moore quoted in Bingham, 1907, described it as: "Smooth, thickened from the second to the 5th segment and thence decreasing to the end; with two short subdorsal fleshy spines on the 4th segment, between which is a transverse pale yellow line, two shorter spines also on the 2nd and 3rd and two on the anal segment; colour green, with a longitudinal posterior lateral and lower pale yellowish line."

=== Pupa ===
The pupa is green with a slender and pointed thoracic projection, yellowish wing cases and lateral bands. "Conical, truncated in front; thorax produced into a lengthened obtusely-pointed frontal process." (Frederic Moore quoted in Bingham, 1907)

== General reading ==
- Kunte, Krushnamegh (2000). Butterflies of Peninsular India. India, A Lifescape. Hyderabad, India: Universities Press. ISBN 978-81-7371-354-5.
- Haribal, Meena (1992). The Butterflies of Sikkim Himalaya and Their Natural History. Gangtok, Sikkim, India: Sikkim Nature Conservation Foundation.
- Evans, W.H. (1932). The Identification of Indian Butterflies (2nd ed.). Mumbai, India: Bombay Natural History Society.s
