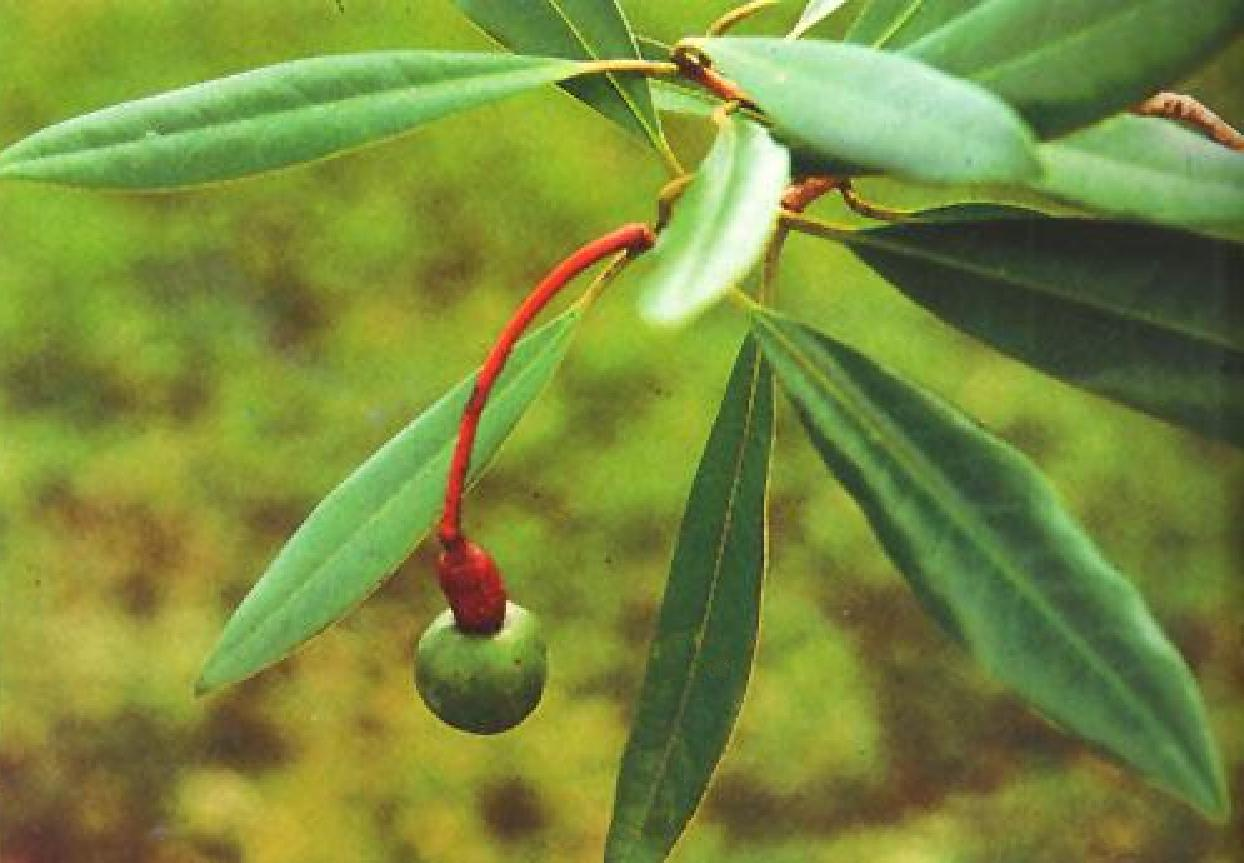
- Alseodaphne hokouensis

Scientific classification
- Kingdom: Plantae
- Clade: Embryophytes
- Clade: Tracheophytes
- Clade: Angiosperms
- Clade: Magnoliids
- Order: Laurales
- Family: Lauraceae
- Genus: Alseodaphne; Nees, 1831

Type species
- Alseodaphne semecarpifolia Nees, 1831

Species
- See text

Synonyms
- Stemmatodaphne Gamble

= Alseodaphne =

Genus of flowering plants

Alseodaphne is a genus of plants in the family Lauraceae, endemic to China and Southeast Asia. The genus has 96 species of evergreen trees to shrubs. They have bisexual flowers, a fruit stalk that is red, green, or yellow, and black fruit.

== Species ==
53 species are currently accepted. They are listed here alphabetically with author and species range:

- Alseodaphne albifrons Kosterm. – Peninsular Malaysia and Borneo
- Alseodaphne archboldiana (C.K.Allen) Kosterm. – New Guinea
- Alseodaphne bancana Miq. – Peninsular Malaysia, Sumatra, and Borneo
- Alseodaphne birmanica Kosterm. – Myanmar and Thailand
- Alseodaphne borneensis Gamble – Borneo
- Alseodaphne dura Kosterm. – Peninsular Malaysia
- Alseodaphne elmeri Merr. – Borneo
- Alseodaphne elongata (Blume) Kosterm. – Sumatra
- Alseodaphne foxiana (Gamble) Kosterm. – Peninsular Malaysia
- Alseodaphne garciniicarpa Kosterm. – Peninsular Malaysia (Perak)
- Alseodaphne glauciflora Kosterm. – Sumatra and Borneo (West Kalimantan)
- Alseodaphne glaucina (A.Chev. ex H.Liu) Kosterm. – Vietnam
- Alseodaphne gracilis Kosterm. – China (southeastern Yunnan)
- Alseodaphne griffithii Kosterm. – Myanmar
- Alseodaphne habrotricha Kosterm. – southern India
- Alseodaphne himalayana Kosterm. – Nepal
- Alseodaphne huanglianshanensis H.W.Li & Y.M.Shui – China (Southern Yunnan)
- Alseodaphne insignis Gamble – Peninsular Malaysia and Borneo
- Alseodaphne intermedia Kosterm. – Peninsular Malaysia and Sumatra
- Alseodaphne khasyana (Meisn.) Kosterm. – Eastern India, Bangladesh, and Myanmar
- Alseodaphne kochummenii Kosterm. – Peninsular Malaysia (Pahang)
- Alseodaphne longipes Kosterm. – Philippines (Samar, Mindanao, Luzon)
- Alseodaphne macrantha Kosterm. – Peninsular Malaysia
- Alseodaphne medogensis H.P.Tsui – southeastern Tibet
- Alseodaphne micrantha Kosterm. – Peninsular Malaysia (Johor)
- Alseodaphne montana Kosterm. – Borneo (Sabah)
- Alseodaphne nicobarica (Chakrab. & Vasudeva Rao) Chakrab. – Nicobar Islands
- Alseodaphne nigrescens (Gamble) Kosterm. – southern Thailand and Peninsular Malaysia
- Alseodaphne oblanceolata (Merr.) Kosterm. – Peninsular Malaysia and Borneo
- Alseodaphne obovata Kosterm. – Peninsular Malaysia and Borneo
- Alseodaphne owdenii R.Parker – Eastern India and Bangladesh
- Alseodaphne paludosa Gamble – Peninsular Malaysia and Sumatra
- Alseodaphne panduriformis Hook.f. – Peninsular Malaysia
- Alseodaphne peduncularis (Nees) Meisn. – Peninsular Malaysia and Sumatra
- Alseodaphne pendulifolia Gamble – Peninsular Malaysia
- Alseodaphne perakensis (Gamble) Kosterm. – Peninsular Malaysia
- Alseodaphne philippinensis (Elmer) Kosterm. – Philippines (Mindanao: Mt. Apo).
- Alseodaphne polyneura Miq. – Sumatra
- Alseodaphne ramosii Kosterm. – Philippines (Palawan: Mt. Victoria)
- Alseodaphne rhododendropsis Kosterm. – Vietnam
- Alseodaphne ridleyi Gamble – Peninsular Malaysia
- Alseodaphne rubriflora Kosterm. – Myanmar (Myitkyina)
- Alseodaphne rubrolignea Kosterm. – Peninsular Malaysia (Pahang) and Borneo
- Alseodaphne semecarpifolia Nees – southern India and Sri Lanka
- Alseodaphne siamensis Kosterm. – Thailand (Ranawung).
- Alseodaphne suboppositifolia Kosterm. – Vietnam (Kontum).
- Alseodaphne sulcata Kosterm. – Borneo (Sabah)
- Alseodaphne tomentosa Kosterm. – Borneo (Sarawak)
- Alseodaphne tonkinensis H.Liu – Vietnam
- Alseodaphne utilis Kosterm. – Vietnam
- Alseodaphne wrayi Gamble – Thailand and Peninsular Malaysia (Perak)
- Alseodaphne yunnanensis Kosterm. – China (southeastern Yunnan)

=== Formerly placed here ===
- Alseodaphnopsis hainanensis (as Alseodaphne hainanensis)
- Alseodaphnopsis rugosa (as Alseodaphne rugosa)

== Chemistry ==
Perakensol is a phenanthrenoid that can be isolated from A. perakensis.
