= A. ridleyi =

A. ridleyi may refer to:

- Alseodaphne ridleyi, a plant species endemic to Malaysia
- Amphisbaena ridleyi, the Ridley's worm lizard or the Noronha worm lizard, a reptile species found in Brazil

== See also ==
- Henry Nicholas Ridley
