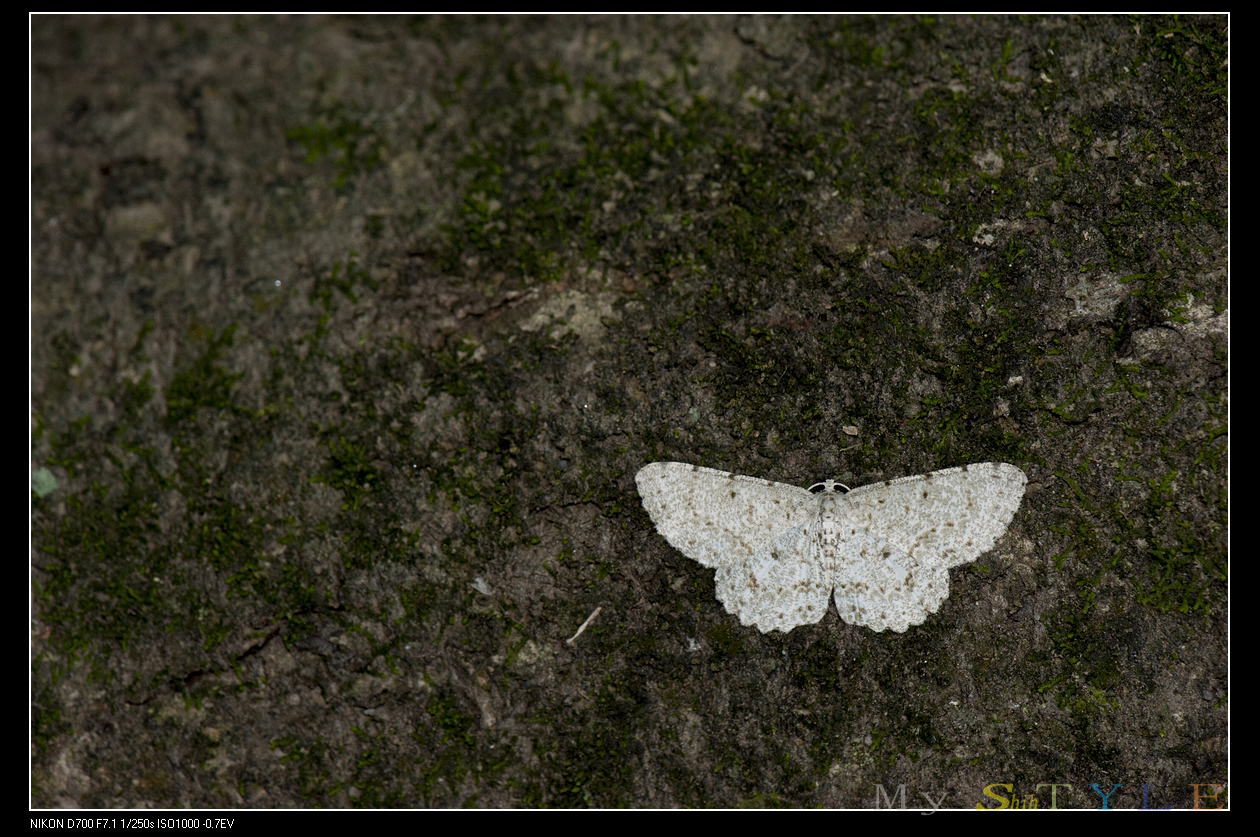

Scientific classification
- Kingdom: Animalia
- Phylum: Arthropoda
- Class: Insecta
- Order: Lepidoptera
- Family: Geometridae
- Subfamily: Ennominae
- Tribe: Boarmiini
- Genus: Catoria
- Species: C. sublavaria

Binomial name
- Catoria sublavaria (Guenee, 1857)

Synonyms
- boarmia sublavaria Guenee, 1857; boarmia spilotaria Snellen, 1881

= Catoria sublavaria =

Species of moth

Catoria sublavaria is a moth of the family Geometridae described by Achille Guenée in 1857. It is found in the tropics of India, Sri Lanka, Myanmar, towards New Guinea, to the Bismarck Islands and Taiwan.

== Description ==
Its wingspan is about 40–45 mm. Forewings with vein 10 and 11 stalked in male, sometimes connected with vein 12, but in female with vein 11 anastomosing (fusing) or coincident with vein 12. Body greyish white. Frons and palpi black. Wings irrorated (sprinkled) with pale fuscous spots. Forewings with antemedial, both wings with medial, postmedial, submarginal and marginal specks series. There are traces of a ring-spot at end of cell. Ventral side fuscous, with very large black cell-spots and white marginal patches at apex and middle of each wing.

Larva cylindrical, a shining black with a faint greenish tinge. It rests slightly curved on a leaf edge. Pupation is in a silken cell on the ground or between two leaves.

The larvae feed on Alseodaphne and Excoecaria species.

== Subspecies ==
- Catoria sublavaria sublavaria
- Catoria sublavaria psimythota Prout, 1929
- Catoria sublavaria spilotaria (Snellen, 1881)
- Catoria sublavaria subnata Prout, 1929
- Catoria sublavaria tenax Prout, 1929
