= Alseodaphne foxiana =

Conservation status
- Least Concern (IUCN 3.1)

Scientific classification
- Kingdom: Plantae
- Clade: Tracheophytes
- Clade: Angiosperms
- Clade: Magnoliids
- Order: Laurales
- Family: Lauraceae
- Genus: Alseodaphne
- Species: A. foxiana

Binomial name
- Alseodaphne foxiana (Gamble) Kosterm.

Synonyms
- Beilschmiedia foxiana Gamble; Alseodaphne reticulata (Gamble) Kosterm.; Nothaphoebe reticulata Gamble

Species of flowering plant

Alseodaphne foxiana is a species of plant in the family Lauraceae. It is endemic to Peninsular Malaysia.
