= Alseodaphne macrantha =

Conservation status
- Endangered (IUCN 3.1)

Scientific classification
- Kingdom: Plantae
- Clade: Tracheophytes
- Clade: Angiosperms
- Clade: Magnoliids
- Order: Laurales
- Family: Lauraceae
- Genus: Alseodaphne
- Species: A. macrantha

Binomial name
- Alseodaphne macrantha Kosterm.

Species of tree

Alseodaphne macrantha is a species of plant in the family Lauraceae. It is a tree endemic to Peninsular Malaysia.
