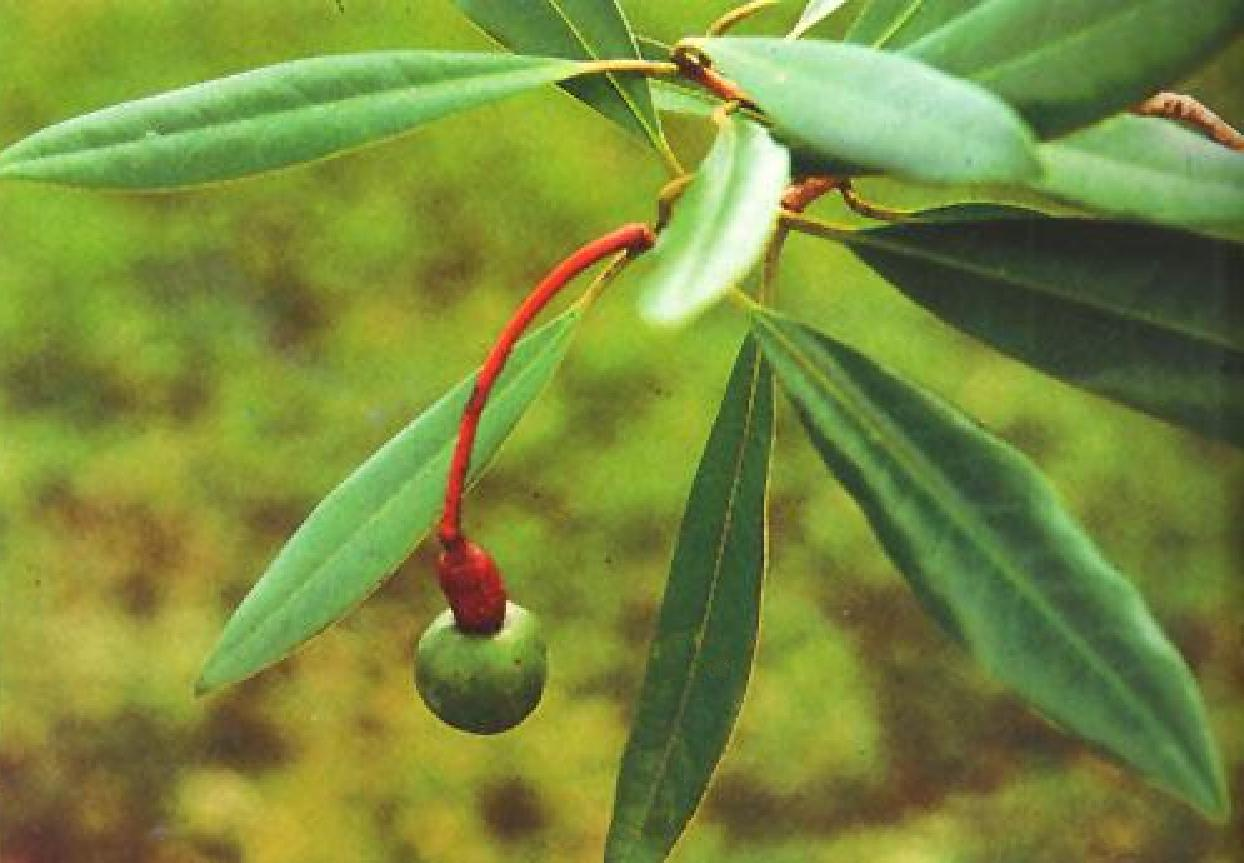

Scientific classification
- Kingdom: Plantae
- Clade: Tracheophytes
- Clade: Angiosperms
- Clade: Magnoliids
- Order: Laurales
- Family: Lauraceae
- Genus: Alseodaphnopsis; H.W.Li & J.Li

= Alseodaphnopsis =

Genus of flowering plants

Alseodaphnopsis is a genus of flowering plants belonging to the family Lauraceae.

Its native range is Eastern Himalaya to Hainan and Indo-China.

Species:

- Alseodaphnopsis andersonii (King ex Hook.f.) H.W.Li & J.Li – eastern India, Tibet, China (southern and southeastern Yunnan), Myanmar, Thailand, Laos, and Vietnam
- Alseodaphnopsis hainanensis (Merr.) H.W.Li & J.Li – Hainan and northern Vietnam
- Alseodaphnopsis hokouensis (H.W.Li) H.W.Li & J.Li – China (southeastern Yunnan)
- Alseodaphnopsis lanuginosa (Kosterm.) H.W.Li & J.Li – northern Vietnam
- Alseodaphnopsis maguanensis L.Li & J.Li – China (Yunnan)
- Alseodaphnopsis marlipoensis (H.W.Li) H.W.Li & J.Li – China (southeastern Yunnan)
- Alseodaphnopsis petiolaris (Meisn.) H.W.Li & J.Li – China (southern Yunnan), Eastern India, Bangladesh, Myanmar, and Vietnam
- Alseodaphnopsis putaoensis L.Li, Y.H.Tan & J.Li – Myanmar
- Alseodaphnopsis rugosa (Merr. & Chun) H.W.Li & J.Li – China (southeastern Yunnan and Hainan) and Vietnam
- Alseodaphnopsis sichourensis (H.W.Li) H.W.Li & J.Li – China (southeastern Yunnan)
- Alseodaphnopsis ximengensis H.W.Li & J.Li – China (Yunnan)
