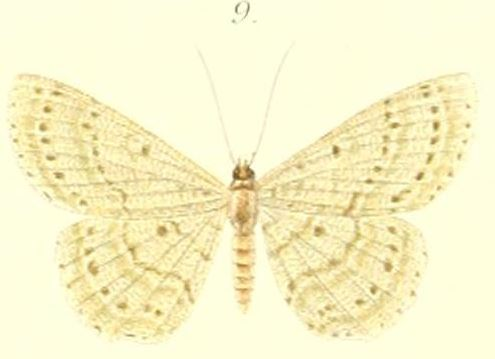

Scientific classification
- Kingdom: Animalia
- Phylum: Arthropoda
- Class: Insecta
- Order: Lepidoptera
- Family: Geometridae
- Subfamily: Ennominae
- Tribe: Boarmiini
- Genus: Catoria
- Species: C. delectaria

Binomial name
- Catoria delectaria (Walker, 1866)

Synonyms
- Ophthalmodes delectaria Walker 1866; Selidosema viridis Turner, 1906; Boarmia viridaria Pagenstecher, 1888; Ophthalmodes plesia Swinhoe, 1907; Catoria vernans Prout, 1929

= Catoria delectaria =

Species of moth

Catoria delectaria is a moth of the family Geometridae. It is found in Australia (Queensland).

Adults are grey with submarginal arcs of dark spots on each wing.

== Subspecies ==
- Catoria delectaria delectaria
- Catoria delectaria plesia (Swinhoe, 1907)
- Catoria delectaria vernans Prout, 1929
