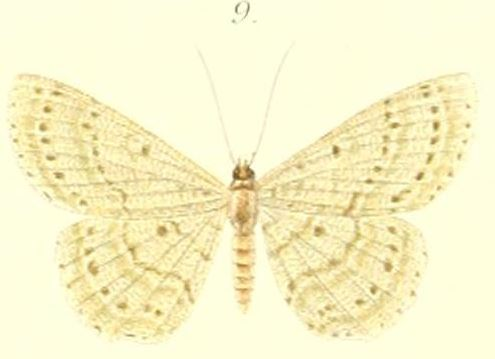
- Catoria delectaria

Scientific classification
- Domain: Eukaryota
- Kingdom: Animalia
- Phylum: Arthropoda
- Class: Insecta
- Order: Lepidoptera
- Family: Geometridae
- Subfamily: Ennominae
- Tribe: Boarmiini
- Genus: Catoria; Moore, [1887]

= Catoria =

Genus of moths

Catoria is a genus of moths in the family Geometridae.

== Selected species ==
- Catoria camelaria (Guenée, 1857)
- Catoria delectaria (Walker, 1866)
- Catoria hemiprosopa (Turner, 1904)
- Catoria olivescens Moore, 1888
- Catoria proicyrta (Prout, 1932)
- Catoria sublavaria (Guenée, 1857)
- Catoria tamsi Prout, 1929
