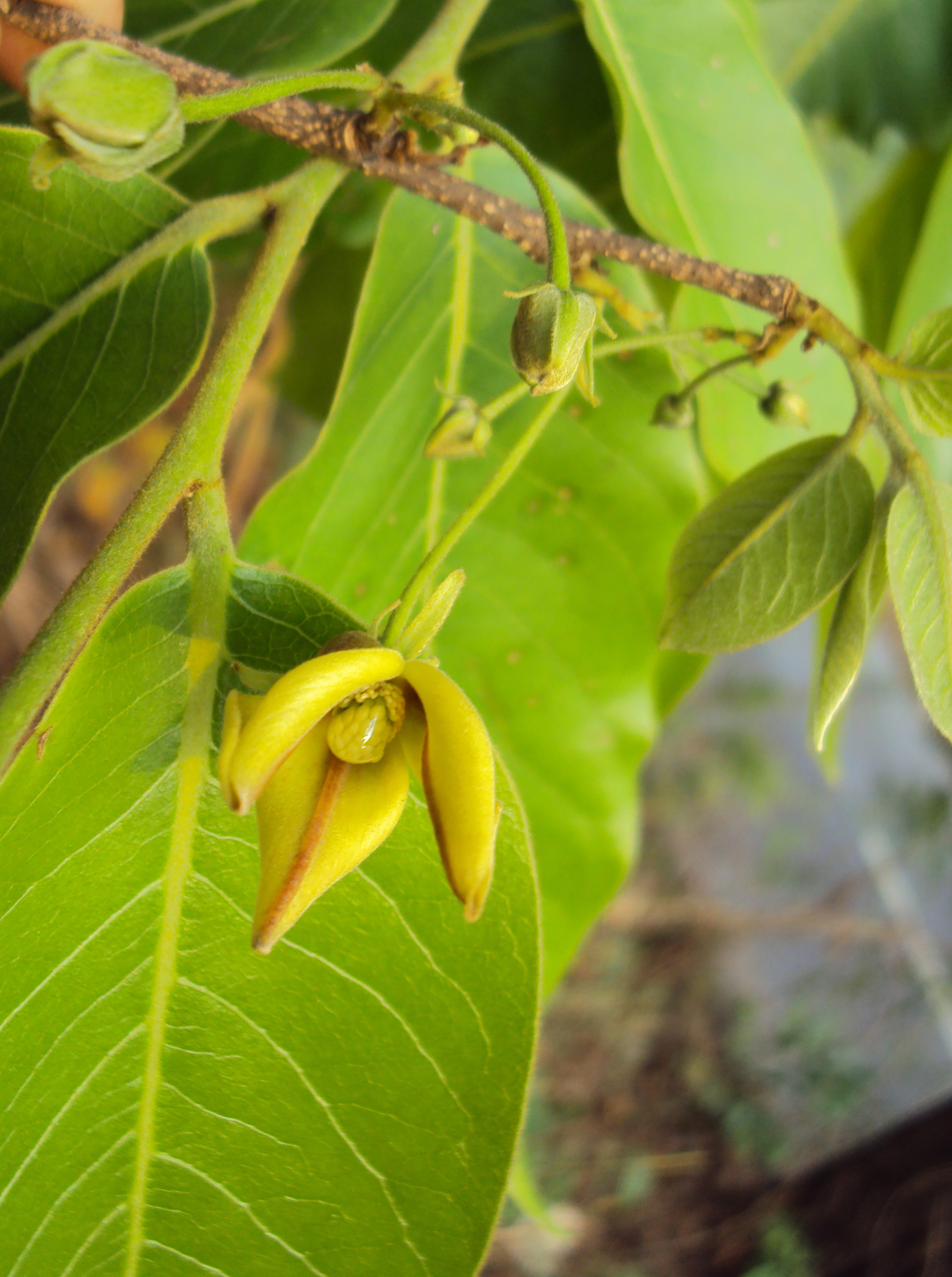
- Leaves and flowers of Miliusa tomentosa

Conservation status
- Least Concern (IUCN 3.1)

Scientific classification
- Kingdom: Plantae
- Clade: Embryophytes
- Clade: Tracheophytes
- Clade: Spermatophytes
- Clade: Angiosperms
- Clade: Magnoliids
- Order: Magnoliales
- Family: Annonaceae
- Genus: Miliusa
- Species: M. tomentosa

Binomial name
- Miliusa tomentosa (Roxb.) J.Sinclair

Synonyms
- Uvaria tomentosa Roxb.; Saccopetalum tomentosum Hook.f. & Thomson

= Miliusa tomentosa =

Species of deciduous tree

Miliusa tomentosa is a large deciduous tree with 15–20 metre height. It is commonly known as wooly miliusa. The native range of this species is Bangladesh, India, Nepal, and Sri Lanka on the Indian subcontinent. It is a tree and grows primarily in the seasonally dry tropics.

== Description ==
Woolly miliusa is a large deciduous tree, growing up to 20 m tall. Bark is blackish brown. Leaves are thick leathery, ovate, oblong, 4–10 cm long, 2–5.5 cm broad, smooth above, softly hairy below, base rounded, margin entire, tip pointed, leaf-stalk 2–5 mm. Flowers are greenish, 1.5 cm across, solitary or in pairs opposite the leaf. Sepals are about 4 mm long, linear-lanceshaped. Petals are 3+3, about 6 mm long, outer petals sepal-like, inner ones oblong to obovate. Fruits are dark purple, nearly spherical, 8–17 arranged in a ring, 2–3 cm across, stalk 1–1.5 cm long, seeds 3–4. It flowers from May to June.

== Taxonomy ==
It belongs to the family Annonaceae.

== Biochemistry ==
A qualitative preliminary phytochemical analysis of dried leaves of this plant revealed the presence of carbohydrate, protein, cardiac glycoside, glycosides, alkaloids, flavonoids, saponins, steroids, anthraquinones, tannins, quinines and inorganic compounds.

== Uses ==
The oil from its seeds is used in Chinese traditional medicine for its antibacterial and analgesic properties.

== Insect food plant ==
Butterflies such as the tawny rajah, tailed jay, common jay, spot swordtail, and narrow banded bluebottle feed on the leaves of this tree.
