= Alseodaphnopsis hainanensis =

Conservation status
- Endangered (IUCN 3.1)

Scientific classification
- Kingdom: Plantae
- Clade: Tracheophytes
- Clade: Angiosperms
- Clade: Magnoliids
- Order: Laurales
- Family: Lauraceae
- Genus: Alseodaphnopsis
- Species: A. hainanensis

Binomial name
- Alseodaphnopsis hainanensis (Merr.) H.W.Li & J.Li

Synonyms
- Alseodaphne hainanensis Merr.

Species of flowering plant

Alseodaphnopsis hainanensis is a species of plant in the family Lauraceae. It is found in Hainan and northern Vietnam. It is threatened by habitat loss.
