= Alseodaphnopsis rugosa =

Conservation status
- Vulnerable (IUCN 3.1)

Scientific classification
- Kingdom: Plantae
- Clade: Tracheophytes
- Clade: Angiosperms
- Clade: Magnoliids
- Order: Laurales
- Family: Lauraceae
- Genus: Alseodaphnopsis
- Species: A. rugosa

Binomial name
- Alseodaphnopsis rugosa (Merr. & Chun) H.W.Li & J.Li

Synonyms
- Alseodaphne rugosa Merr. & Chun

Species of plant

Alseodaphnopsis rugosa is a species of plant in the family Lauraceae. It is a tree native to southeastern Yunnan and Hainan in southern China and northern Vietnam. It grows in mixed forests in valleys. It is threatened by habitat loss.
