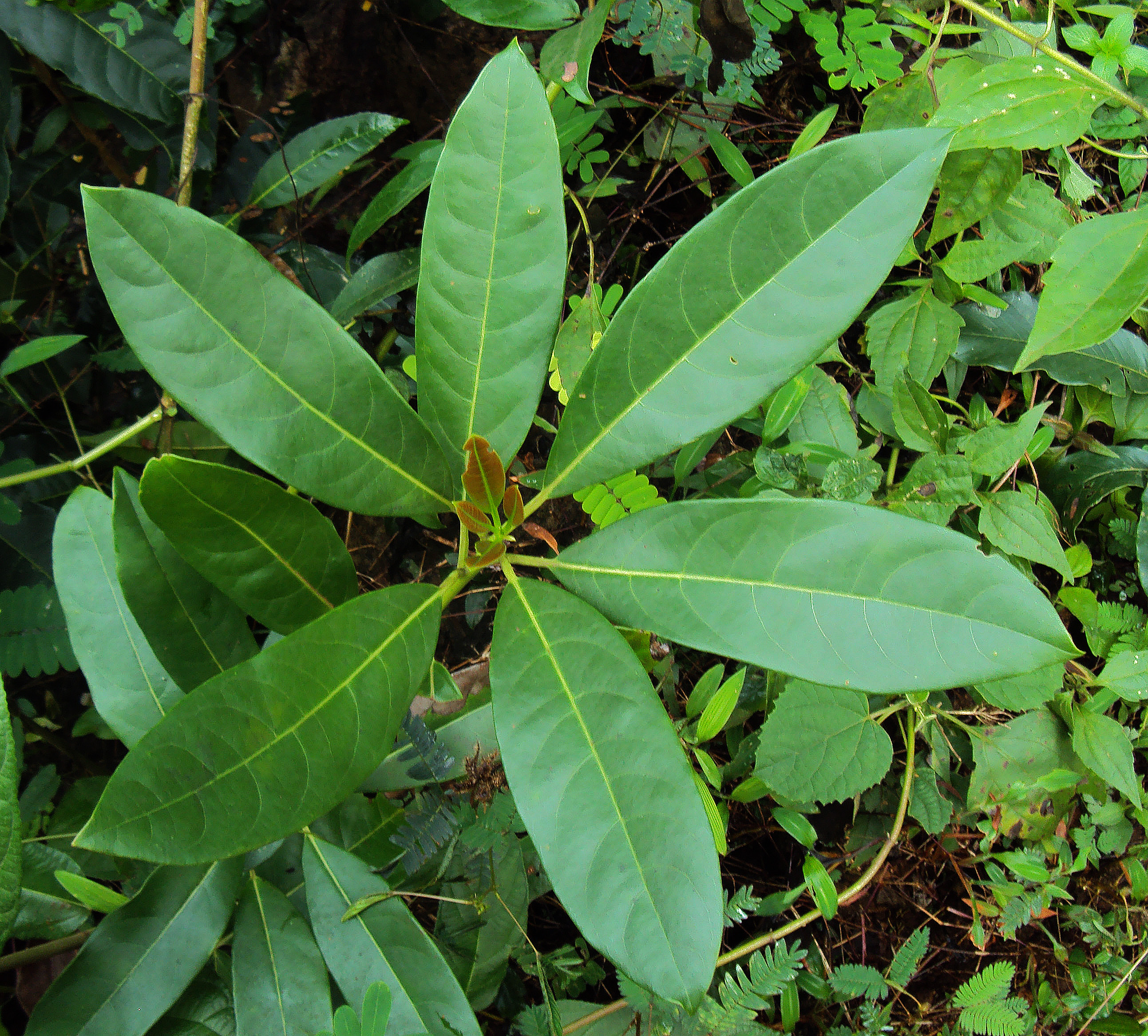

Scientific classification
- Kingdom: Plantae
- Clade: Tracheophytes
- Clade: Angiosperms
- Clade: Magnoliids
- Order: Laurales
- Family: Lauraceae
- Genus: Machilus
- Species: M. macranthus

Binomial name
- Machilus macranthus Nees

Synonyms
- Persea macrantha (Nees) Kosterm.

= Machilus macranthus =

Large-flowered bay tree

Species of tree

Machilus macranthus, the large-flowered bay tree, is an evergreen tree in the laurel family (Lauraceae), native to India, Sri Lanka, the Himalayas, Myanmar, and western Yunnan in south-central China.

The tree grows in the Western Ghats mountain range of India, and can reach 30 m (98 ft). Leaves are simple, alternate, spiral; lamina obovate or elliptic to elliptic-oblong; apex rounded or acuminate or acute; base acute to rounded with entire margin. Flowers show terminal panicle inflorescence. Fruit is a berry which becomes blackish on ripening.

The plant is known to have medicinal properties and used in Ayurveda.

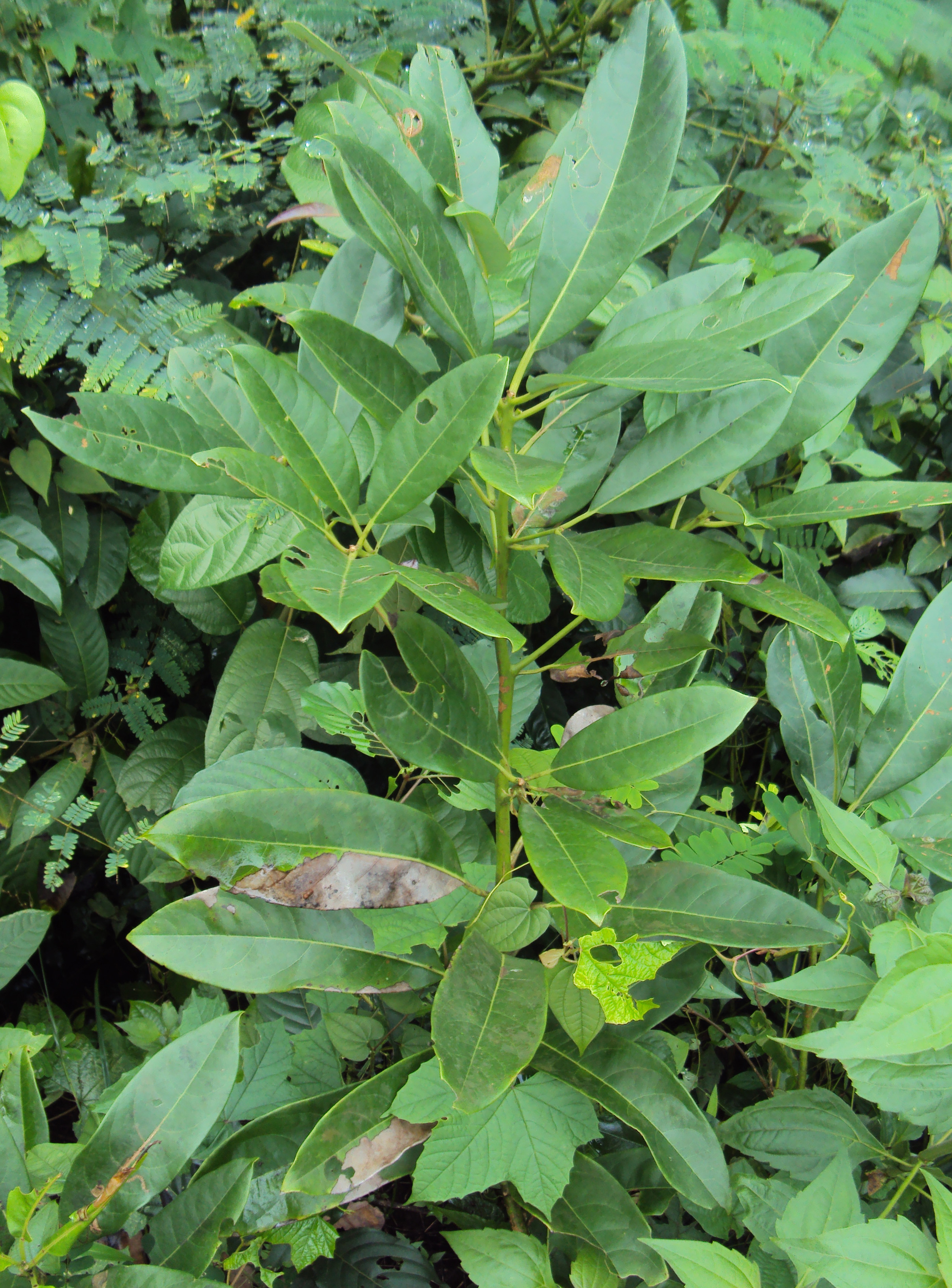

== Common names ==
- Kannada - chittu thandri, gulamaavu, gulimaavu
- Malayalam - kulamavu, ooravu
- Marathi - gulaamba
- Tamil - iruli, kolamavu, kolarmavu
- Telugu - naara
