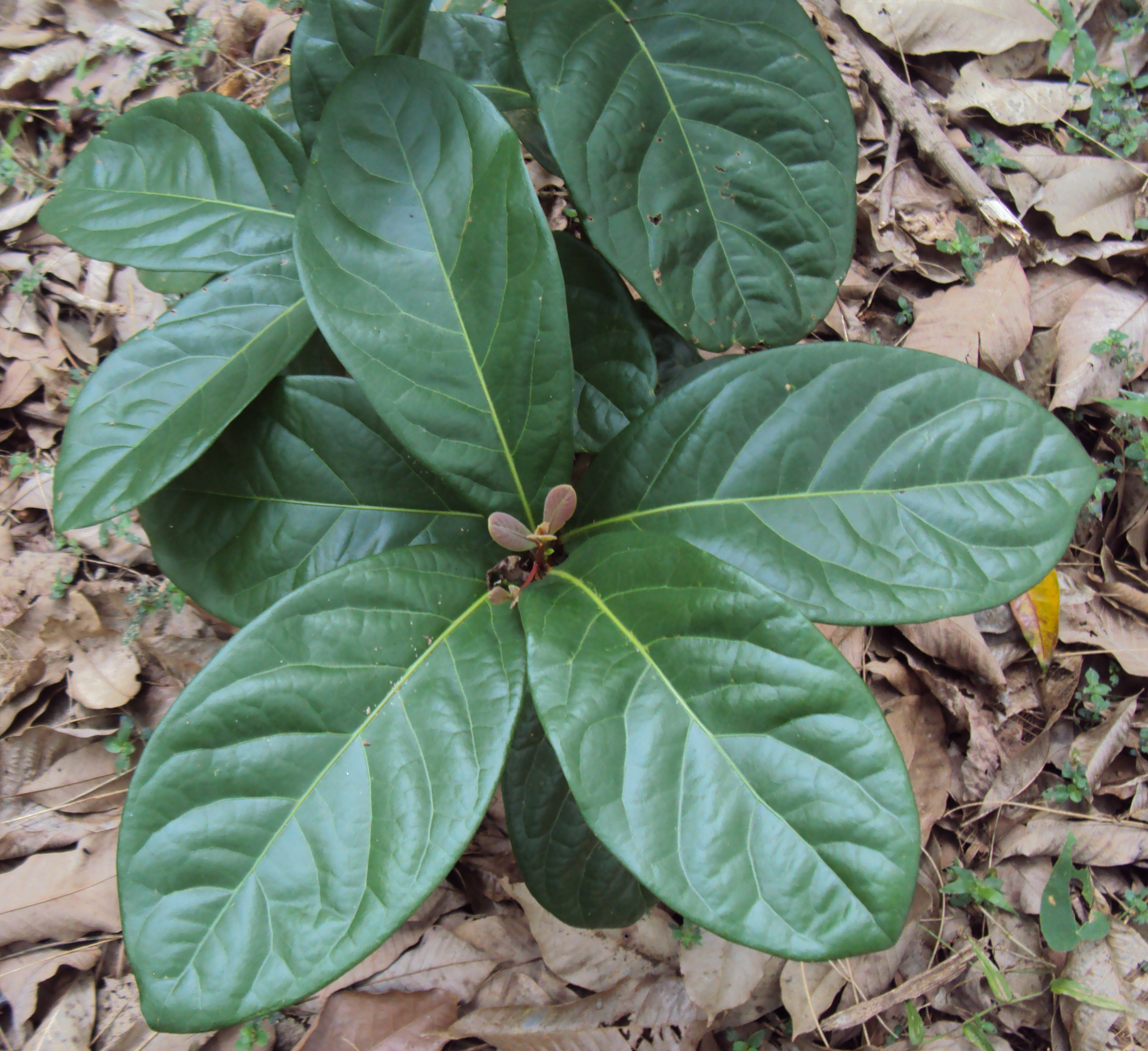

Conservation status
- Least Concern (IUCN 3.1)

Scientific classification
- Kingdom: Plantae
- Clade: Tracheophytes
- Clade: Angiosperms
- Clade: Magnoliids
- Order: Laurales
- Family: Lauraceae
- Genus: Alseodaphne
- Species: A. semecarpifolia

Binomial name
- Alseodaphne semecarpifolia Nees

Synonyms
- Alseodaphne semecarpifolia var. angustifolia Meisn.; Alseodaphne semecarpifolia var. malabarica Robi & Udayan; Alseodaphne semecarpifolia var. parvifolia Wight; Laurus semecarpifolia Wall.; Persea semecarpifolia Nees) Trimen; Tabernaemontana tenuifolia Willd. ex Meisn.

= Alseodaphne semecarpifolia =

Species of flowering plant

Alseodaphne semecarpifolia is a species of flowering plant in the family Lauraceae. It is a tree native to Sri Lanka and to the Western Ghats and southern Eastern Ghats of southern India. It grows up to 18 metres tall. The bark is brown in color. Leaves are simple, alternate; lamina obovate, apex obtuse or rounded; base cuneate to acute; margin entire; 6 to 10 secondary nerves. Flowers show panicle inflorescence. Fruit is a one-seeded berry. It grows in seasonally-dry tropical forests from 100 to 1,500 metres elevation. It is threatened by habitat loss.

== Common names ==
- Marathi - phudgus (फुडगुस)
- Tamil - kanaippirandai (கணைப்பிரண்டை )
- Malayalam - mulaknaari (മുളക്നാറി )
- Telugu - naaramaamidi (నారమామిడి )
- Kannada - nelthare (ನೆಲ್ಥರೆ )
- Konkani - rani (राणी )
- Sinhala - Wewarani (වෑවරන)
